During times of war where naval engagements were frequent, many battles were fought that often resulted in the capture of the enemy's ships. The ships were often renamed and used in the service of the capturing country's navy. Merchant ships were also captured and taken into service by their captors.

1701–10

1702
: Battle of Vigo Bay, 23 October: The 60-gun ship was captured by the Royal Navy.
: Battle of Vigo Bay, 23 October: The 68-gun ship was captured by the Royal Netherlands Navy.
: Battle of Vigo Bay, 23 October: The 70-gun ship was captured by the Royal Navy.
: Battle of Vigo Bay, 23 October: The 70-gun ship was captured by the Royal Navy.
: The 10-gun ketch was captured by the French Navy.
: Battle of Vigo Bay, 23 October: The 56-gun ship was captured by the Royal Navy.
: Battle of Vigo Bay, 23 October: The 76-gun ship was captured by the Royal Navy.
: Battle of Vigo Bay, 23 October: The 60-gun ship was captured by the Royal Navy and Royal Netherlands Navy.
: Battle of Vigo Bay, 23 October: The 70-gun ship was captured by the Royal Navy and Royal Netherlands Navy.
: Battle of Vigo Bay, 23 October: The 44-gun ship was captured by the Royal Navy.
: Battle of Vigo Bay, 23 October: The 44-gun ship was captured by the Royal Navy and Royal Netherlands Navy.

1703
: The 24-gun sixth rate was captured by the Royal Navy.
: The 50-gun ship was captured by the Royal Navy.
: The 40-gun ship was captured by the French Navy.
: The 50-gun fourth rate was captured on 10 April by the French Navy's  and three privateers.

1704
: The 70-gun third rate was captured by the French Navy.
: The 50-gun fourth rate was captured by the French Navy.

1705
: Battle of Cabrita Point, 21 March: The 66-gun ship was captured by the Royal Netherlands Navy.
: Battle of Cabrita Point, 21 March: The 58-gun ship was captured by the Royal Navy.
: The 50-gun fourth rate was captured by the French Navy's .
: The 24-gun sixth rate frigate was captured in May by the Royal Navy.
: Battle of Cabrita Point, 21 March: The 60-gun ship was captured by the Royal Netherlands Navy.
: The 54-gun ship was captured by the Royal Navy.
: The 50-gun fourth rate was captured in October by the French Navy.
:  The 44-gun ship was captured by the Royal Navy.

1706
: The 50-gun ship was captured by the French Navy.

1707
: The 54-gun ship was captured in March by Dutch privateers.
 ( Royal Navy): Battle at The Lizard, 21 October: The 50-gun fourth rate was captured by the French Navy.
 ( Royal Navy): The 4-gun hoy was captured by the French Navy.
 ( Royal Navy): Battle at The Lizard, 21 October: The 40-gun fourth rate was captured by the French Navy's .
:  The 50-gun ship was captured by the Royal Navy.

1708
: The 50-gun fourth rate was captured on 15 March by the Royal Navy.
: The 50-gun fourth rate was captured on 15 March by the Royal Navy's .
: The 50-gun ship was captured by the French Navy.

1709
 ( Royal Navy): The 44-gun fourth rate was captured on 1 March by the French Navy.
 ( Royal Navy): The 50-gun fourth rate was captured by the French Navy.
: The 50-gun fourth rate was captured on 17 March by the Royal Navy's .
:  The 46-gun ship was captured by the Royal Navy.
: The 32-gun fourth rate was captured by the French Navy's .
:  The 38-gun ship was captured by the Royal Navy.
 ( Royal Navy): The 60-gun fourth rate was captured on 26 October by the French Navy.
: The 4-gun hoy was captured by the Royal Navy.
 ( Royal Navy): The 60-gun fourth rate was captured by the French Navy.

1710
: The 56-gun ship was captured by the Royal Navy.
: The 70-gun ship was captured by the Royal Navy.
 ( Royal Navy): The 24-gun sixth rate was captured by a French privateer.
: The 54-gun ship was captured by the Royal Navy.
: The 56-gun ship was captured by the Royal Navy.

1711–20

1711
: The 60-gun fourth rate was captured by the Royal Navy.
: The 56-gun ship was captured by the French Navy.
: The 62-gun ship was captured by the Royal Navy.

1712
:  The 50-gun ship was captured by the Royal Navy.

1713
: The 70-gun ship was captured by the Imperial Russian Navy.

1714
: The 52-gun ship was captured by the Royal Swedish Navy.

1717
Great Allen: The merchant ship was captured, looted, burnt and sunk off Cape St. Vincent by Queen Anne's Revenge ( Blackbeard).
La Concorde: The slave ship was captured on 28 November off Saint Vincent by Revenge and another ship (both  Blackbeard).
Margaret: The merchant ship was captured on 5 December off Anguilla by Queen Anne's Revenge ( Blackbeard). She was looted and then released.
Whydah Gally: The slave ship was captured in late February in the Windward Passage by Sultana ( "Black Sam" Bellamy). She wrecked in a storm off Cape Cod two months later, taking Bellamy, 143 men, and 4.5 tons of treasure with her – and was the first pirate ship ever discovered in North America, in 1984.

1718
: Battle of Cape Passaro, 11 August.
Protestant Caesar: The merchant ship was captured on 9 April by  Adventure, Revenge, Queen Anne's Revenge, and other ships (all  Blackbeard). She was looted, burnt and sunk.

1719
 : Battle of Ösel Island, 24 May: The 10-gun ship was captured by the Imperial Russian Navy.
: Battle of Ösel Island, 24 May: The 30-gun ship was captured by the Imperial Russian Navy.
: Battle of Ösel Island, 24 May: The 52-gun ship was captured by the Imperial Russian Navy.

Unknown date
: The 56-gun ship was captured in 1713 or 1714 by the Royal Swedish Navy.

1721–30

1722
Ranger ( Bartholomew Roberts): The pirate ship was captured on 5 February by the Royal Navy's .
Royal Fortune ( Bartholomew Roberts): The pirate ship was captured on 10 February by the Royal Navy's .

1725
Prince Frederick([[discovery.ucl.ac.uk/1349550/1/473433.pdf)" class="wikEdFilePreview" id="wikEdFilePreview7" style="width: 75px; height: 75px; display: none;">File:Captain Wittington Williams ]]: The British merchant ship was captured by the Spanish at Vera Cruz.

1731–40

1731
 ( Royal Navy): The brig Rebecca, commanded by Robert Jenkins, was captured in April 1731 by the Spanish Navy, on suspicion of smuggling, being casus belli of the War of Jenkins' Ear.

1739
: The ship was captured on 3 March by the Royal Navy.

1741–50

1744
: The merchant ship was captured in February by the French Navy.

1745
 ( Royal Navy): The 14-gun sloop was captured by the French Navy.
: The 64-gun ship was captured by the Royal Navy.

1746
  ( Royal Navy): The 14-gun sloop was captured by the French Navy.
: The 58-gun ship was captured by the Royal Navy.
: The 18-gun sloop was captured by the Royal Navy.
 ( Royal Navy): The 10-gun sloop was captured by the French Navy.
: The 60-gun ship was captured by the Royal Navy.
: The 64-gun ship was captured in October by the Royal Navy.
  ( Royal Navy): The 50-gun fourth rate was captured by the French Navy.

1747
: First Battle of Cape Finisterre, 3 May: The 74-gun ship was captured by the Royal Navy.
: Second Battle of Cape Finisterre, 14 June: The 74-gun ship was captured by the Royal Navy.
: First Battle of Cape Finisterre, 3 May: The 50-gun ship was captured by the Royal Navy.
: First Battle of Cape Finisterre, 3 May: The 58-gun ship was captured by the Royal Navy.
: First Battle of Cape Finisterre, 3 May: The 74-gun ship was captured by the Royal Navy.
: Second Battle of Cape Finisterre, 14 June: The 74-gun third rate was captured by the Royal Navy.
: Second Battle of Cape Finisterre, 14 June: The 74-gun ship was captured by the Royal Navy.
: The 30-gun fifth rate was captured by the Royal Navy's .
: First Battle of Cape Finisterre, 3 May: The 74-gun ship was captured by the Royal Navy.
: First Battle of Cape Finisterre, 3 May: The 74-gun ship was captured by the Royal Navy.
: Second Battle of Cape Finisterre, 14 June: The 50-gun fourth rate was captured by the Royal Navy.
: Second Battle of Cape Finisterre, 14 June: The 74-gun ship was captured by the Royal Navy.
: Second Battle of Cape Finisterre, 14 June: The 64-gun ship was captured by the Royal Navy.
: The 70-gun ship was captured on 19 October by the Royal Navy, after the 4 battles of the Voyage of the Glorioso.

1748
: The Compagnie des Indes ship was captured by the French Navy.
: The 74-gun third rate was captured by the Royal Navy.

1751–60

1755
: The 64-gun ship was captured by the Royal Navy.

1756
: The 58-gun ship was captured by the Royal Navy.
 ( Royal Navy): The 60-gun fourth rate was captured in March by the French Navy.

1757
: The 64-gun ship was captured by the Royal Navy.
: The 50-gun fourth rate was captured on 17 March by the French Navy.

1758
: The privateer was captured by the British. 
: The 64-gun ship was captured on 2 November in the Irish Sea by the Royal Navy's .
: Siege of Louisbourg: The 64-gun ship was captured on 25 July by the Royal Navy's .
: The 24-gun sixth rate was captured by the Royal Navy.
: Battle of Fort Niagara, 6–26 July: The snow was captured uncompleted at Fort Niagara, New France and completed as HMS Mohawk.
: The 64-gun ship was captured in February by the Royal Navy.

1759
: Battle of Lagos, 19 August: The 74-gun ship was captured on 18 August by the Royal Navy.
: Battle of Quiberon Bay, 20 November: The 80-gun ship was captured on 20 November by the Royal Navy's .
: Battle of Lagos, 19 August: The 64-gun ship was captured on 18 August by the Royal Navy.
: The 60-gun ship was captured by the Royal Navy.
: Battle of Lagos, 19 August: The 74-gun ship was captured on 18 August by the Royal Navy's .

1761–70

1761
: The 64-gun ship was captured in July by the Royal Navy.
: The 64-gun ship was captured on 3 April by the Royal Navy.
: The 18-gun sloop was captured on 30 January by the Royal Navy.
: The 74-gun ship was captured by the Royal Navy.
: The 56-gun ship was captured on 1 April by the Royal Navy's .
: The 64-gun ship was captured by the Royal Navy.
: The  was captured on 8 January by the Royal Navy.
: The 60-gun fourth rate was captured on 24 January by the Royal Navy.

1762
: The 60-gun ship was captured on 13 August by the Royal Navy.
: The  was captured on 23 May by the French Navy.
: The 28-gun frigate was captured in the action of 31 May 1762 by the Royal Navy.
: The 74-gun ship was captured on 13 August by the Royal Navy.
: The 64-gun ship was captured on 13 August by the Royal Navy.

1770
: Battle of Chesma, 5–7 July: The 60-gun ship was captured by the Imperial Russian Navy.

1771–80

1775
 ( Royal Navy): The 10-gun sloop was captured by an American privateer.

1776
 ( Continental Navy): The sloop was captured by the Royal Navy's .
Mifflin ( Continental Navy): Commanded by G. W. Babcock, captured 1776 by British cruisers at New York.
 ( Continental Navy): The 14-gun schooner was captured on 26 August by the Royal Navy's .

1777
 Delaware: The 24-gun frigate commanded by Captain Charles Alexander, was captured after running aground near Philadelphia on September 26, 1777.  She was taken into the Royal Navy as the Delaware. 
: The 32-gun frigate was captured on 8 July by the Royal Navy's  (44).
Industrious Bee: The brigantine was captured on 29 August by the Continental Navy's .
USS Lexington (1776): The 14-gun brigantine was captured by the Royal Navy's .
: The 14-gun brig was captured by the Royal Navy.

1778
 ( Royal Navy): The 18-gun sloop was captured in April by the French Navy's .
 ( Royal Navy): The 12-gun sloop was captured by the United States Navy.
 Raleigh: The 32-gun frigate ran aground at Matinicus Isle, Maine and was abandoned. She was captured by the Royal Navy three days later and refloated.

1779
: The convict ship was captured by the Royal Navy's .
 ( Royal Navy): The 64-gun third rate was captured on 17 August by the French Navy's .
 ( Royal Navy): The  was captured on 10 September by the French Navy's .
: The privateer was captured on 13 October by the Royal Navy's .
: The 14-gun brig-sloop was captured by the Royal Navy.
 ( Royal Navy): The  was captured on 1 May by the French Navy's .

1780
: The frigate was captured on 14 July by the Royal Navy's .
 Boston: The 24-gun frigate was captured at the end of the siege of Charleston, South Carolina.  She was taken into the Royal Navy as HMS Charleston.
: Battle of Cape St. Vincent, 16 January: The 70-gun ship was captured by the Royal Navy.
: Battle of Cape St. Vincent, 16 January: The 80-gun ship was captured by the Royal Navy.
 ( Royal Navy): The 14-gun sloop was captured by the French Navy.
: Action of 8 January 1780: The armed merchantman was captured by the Royal Navy.
: The ship was captured by the Royal Navy.
: The frigate was captured by the Royal Navy.
: Battle of Cape St. Vincent, 16 January: The 68-gun ship was captured by the Royal Navy.
: Battle of Cape St. Vincent, 16 January: The 70-gun ship was captured by the Royal Navy.
: The 44-gun fifth rate was captured by the Royal Navy.
: The 64-gun ship was captured on 24 February by the Royal Navy.
 Providence: The 28-gun frigate was captured at the end of the siege of Charleston, South Carolina. The Royal Navy took her into service as HMS Providence.  
: Action of 8 January 1780: The 16-gun private corvette was captured by the Royal Navy.
 : Battle of Cape St. Vincent, 16 January: The 70-gun ship was captured by the Royal Navy.
: The 28-gun East India Company's Indiaman was captured in the Action of 9 August by the Spanish Navy, along with other 54 British ships.
: The 28-gun East India Company's Indiaman was captured in the Action of 9 August by the Spanish Navy, along with other 54 British ships.
: The 30-gun East India Company's Indiaman was captured in the Action of 9 August by the Spanish Navy, along with 54 other British ships.
: The 28-gun East India Company's Indiaman was captured in the Action of 9 August by the Spanish Navy, along with other 54 British ships.
: The Spanish Navy captured the 28-gun East India Company's East Indiaman in the Action of 9 August, along with other 54 British ships.

1781–90

1781
: The Royal Navy captured the Baleine-class cargo ship on 12 December; the Navy took her into service as HMS Abondance.
(): The 20-gun brig under the command of Captain James Magee was captured by British frigate, HMS Amphytrite off Cape Ann, Massachusetts. She was taken into the Royal Navy.
: The  was captured on 2 July by the Royal Navy's .
Mars: The 18-gun privateer brig-sloop was captured on 3 December by the Royal Navy's .
 ( Royal Navy): The  was captured on 11 September by the French Navy.
: The fourth rate was captured by the Royal Navy.
 ( Royal Navy): The 18-gun sloop-of-war was captured on 3 April by the Spanish Navy during the Siege of Pensacola. 

1782
: The 64-gun ship was captured in April by the Royal Navy.
: The 64-gun ship was captured.
: Battle of the Saintes, 9–12 April: The 64-gun third rate was captured by the Royal Navy.
: The 64-gun ship was captured by the Royal Navy.
: The 74-gun ship was captured by the Royal Navy.
: Battle of the Saintes, 9–12 April: The 74-gun ship was captured by the Royal Navy
: Battle of the Saintes, 9–12 April: The  was captured by the Royal Navy.
 ( Royal Navy): The 50-gun fourth rate was captured on 21 January by the French Navy's .
 ( Royal Navy): The  was captured by the French Navy
HMS Iris ( Royal Navy): The frigate was captured on 9 September by the French Navy's .
: Battle of the Mona Passage, 19 April: The 64-gun ship was captured on 19 April by the Royal Navy.
: The 74-gun ship was captured by the Royal Navy.
: The  was captured on 21 April by the Royal Navy's .
: Great Siege of Gibraltar, 24 June 1779 – 7 February 1783: The 74-gun ship was captured by the Royal Navy.
: Action of 6 December 1782: The 64-gun ship was captured by the Royal Navy's .
 South Carolina: The 40-gun frigate of the South Carolina navy was captured by HMs Diomede (44), HMS Quebec (32), and HMS Astraea (32) on December 22, 1782. 
: The 90-gun first rate was captured in April by the Royal Navy.

1783
: The  was captured on 15 February by the Royal Navy's .
 ( Royal Navy): The 28-gun sixth rate was captured on 12 January by the French Navy.

1788
: The 62-gun ship was captured by the Imperial Russian Navy.
: Battle of Hogland, 17 July: The 74-gun ship was captured by the Imperial Russian Navy.
: Battle of Hogland, 17 July: The 74-gun ship was captured by the Royal Swedish Navy.

1789
: The sloop was captured in March by the Spanish Navy.

1790
: Battle of Vyborg Bay, 4 July: The 60-gun ship was captured by the Imperial Russian Navy.
: Battle of Tendra, 8–9 September: The 78-gun ship was captured by the Imperial Russian Navy.
: Battle of Reval, 13 May: The 64-gun ship was captured by the Imperial Russian Navy.
: Battle of Vyborg Bay, 4 July: The 66-gun ship was captured by the Imperial Russian Navy.
: Battle of Vyborg Bay, 4 July: The 66-gun ship was captured by the Imperial Russian Navy.
: Battle of Vyborg Bay, 4 July: The 74-gun ship was captured by the Imperial Russian Navy.
: Battle of Vyborg Bay, 4 July: The 54-gun ship was captured by the Imperial Russian Navy.

1791–1800

1793
Adamant: The ship was captured off Saint Vincent by a French ship and sent to Martinique.
Adventure: The snow was captured by a French privateer and sent to Charleston, South Carolina, United States.
: The East India Company's merchant ship was captured in May by a French privateer.
: Siege of Toulon 18 September – 18 December: The  was seized by the Royal Navy as a prize of war.
: Siege of Toulon: The 74-gun ship was seized in August by the Royal Navy as a prize of war.
: The 74-gun ship was captured in December by the French with the breaking of the Siege of Toulon.
Alert: The ship was captured in the Mediterranean sea by a French ship and sent into Marseille, Var.
: The brig was captured on 28 August by the Royal Navy.
 ( Royal Navy): The brig was burnt and scuttled on 18 December. She was salvaged by the French Navy on 28 December.
Alodia: The ship was captured by Little Democrat and sent to Philadelphia, Pennsylvania, United States.
Amelia The ship was captured while on a voyage from Barbados to St. John's, Newfoundland, British North America.
Amity: The ship was captured by the French privateer Club.
Ant: The ship was captured by the French privateer Club.
Beau: The ship was captured in the Atlantic ocean off the coast of Africa by the British ship Hope.
Britannia:: A French privateer captured Britannia in July as Britannia was returning from her first whaling voyage.
Brothers: The ship was captured and taken into New York, United States.
Brutus: The snow was captured in the Bengal River.
Camilla: The ship was captured by a French privateer but was later recaptured by Harriot and Speightown (both ), which were operating under letters of marque.
: Siege of Toulon:  was seized in August by the Royal Navy as a prize of war.
: The  was captured in December by the French with the breaking of the Siege of Toulon.
: Siege of Toulon:  was seized in August by the Royal Navy as a prize of war.
: The  was captured in December by the French with the breaking of the Siege of Toulon.
Chandenque: The schooner was captured in the Bengal River.
Chilcomb: The ship was captured in the Atlantic Ocean by the French vessel Carmagnole and sent to New York.
: Action of 18 June 1793: The  was captured by the Royal Navy's .
: Siege of Toulon: The  was seized on 29 August by the Royal Navy as a prize of war.
: Siege of Toulon: The  was seized in August by the Royal Navy as a prize of war.
: The  was captured in December by the French with the breaking of the Siege of Toulon.
Culloden: The ship was seized as a prize at Dunkerque, Nord, France.
Delight: The ship was captured by Mary and sent to Liverpool, Lancashire, Kingdom of Great Britain.
Delight: The ship was captured by a French privateer off Grenada.
: The 74-gun ship was seized in August by the Royal Navy as a prize of war.
Diligent: The ship was captured in the Mediterranean sea by a French ship and sent into Marseille.
: Siege of Toulon:  was seized in August by the Royal Navy as a prize of war.
Druid: The ship was captured by a French ship on 5 November and sent to Dunkerque, Nord.
: Siege of Toulon:  was seized in August by the Royal Navy as a prize of war.
: The  was captured in December by the French with the breaking of the Siege of Toulon.
: The 16-gun brig-sloop was captured by the Royal Navy's .
Esther and Kitty: The ship was captured and taken to Bergen, Norway.
Fancy: The ship was captured by the French privateer Republican in November and sent to Martinique.
Favourite: The ship was seized as a prize at Ostend, West Flanders, France.
Flora: The ship was captured by a French ship while on a voyage from Wilmington, Delaware, United States to Jamaica.
: Siege of Toulon:  was seized in August by the Royal Navy as a prize of war.
: The  was captured in December by the French with the breaking of the Siege of Toulon.
George: The ship was captured in the Mediterranean sea by a French ship and sent into Marseille.
Good Hope: The ship was captured by a French privateer and sent to a Norwegian port.
Good Intent: The ship was captured and taken to New York.
Greyhound: The ship was captured off Jamaica by a French privateer.
: Siege of Toulon: The 74-gun ship was seized in August by the Royal Navy as a prize of war.
: The 74-gun ship was captured in December by the French with the breaking of the Siege of Toulon.
: Siege of Toulon: The 64-gun ship was seized in August by the Royal Navy as a prize of war.
: The 64-gun ship was captured in December by the French with the breaking of the Siege of Toulon.
Harriot: The ship was captured by a French privateer and sent into Charleston.
: Siege of Toulon: The 74-gun ship was seized in August by the Royal Navy as a prize of war.
: Siege of Toulon:  was seized in August by the Royal Navy as a prize of war.
: The  was captured in December by the French with the breaking of the Siege of Toulon.
Hope: The ship was captured by the French vessel Citizen Genet and sent to Philadelphia.
: The  was captured on 11 October by the Spanish Navy's  and the Royal Navy's .
Jupiter: The ship was captured by the French privateer La Reunion and sent to Cherbourg, Seine-Maritime but foundered before she reached port.
La Constance: The snow was captured in the Bengal River.
: Siege of Toulon: The 80-gun ship was seized on 29 August by the Royal Navy as a prize of war.
: The 80-gun ship was captured in December by the French with the breaking of the Siege of Toulon.
La St. Dominique: The full-rigged ship was captured in the Bengal River.
L'Egalité: The ship was captured in the Atlantic ocean off the coast of Africa by the British ship Hope.
Le Maria: The ship was captured in the Atlantic ocean off the coast of Africa by the British ship Hope.
Les Deux Amis: The full-rigged ship was captured in the Bengal River.
: Siege of Toulon: The 80-gun ship was seized in August by the Royal Navy as a prize of war.
: Siege of Toulon: The 74-gun ship was seized in August by the Royal Navy as a prize of war.
: The 74-gun ship was burnt in December at Toulon. She was later salvaged and repaired by the French Navy.
Lillies: The ship was captured by the French frigate La Blonde and sent into Brest, Finistère.
L'Oiseul: The armed lugger was captured in the Bay of Biscay off Belle Île, Morbihan by Lottery.
: Siege of Toulon: The  was seized in August by the Royal Navy as a prize of war.
Maria: The ship was captured by a French privateer and sent to Charleston.
: Siege of Toulon:  was seized in August by the Royal Navy as a prize of war.
: The  was captured in December by the French with the breaking of the Siege of Toulon.
: The  on 17 October by the Royal Navy's .
Nancy: The ship was captured off the mouth of the Delaware River and sent to New York.
Nautilus: The ship was captured in the Mediterranean sea by a French ship and sent into Marseille.
: Siege of Toulon: The  was seized on 20 August by the Royal Navy as a prize of war.
Nestor: The snow was captured in the Bengal River.
Prince William Henry: The ship was captured by a French ship in the West Indies.
: Siege of Toulon: The  was surrendered on 29 August to the Royal Navy.
Queen: The ship was captured by a French ship in the West Indies.
Reddington: The ship was captured in November by the French privateer Industry and sent to a Virginian port.
Robert: The ship was captured and taken to New York.
: Siege of Toulon: The  was seized in August by the Royal Navy as a prize of war.
: The  was captured in December by the French with the breaking of the Siege of Toulon.
: Siege of Toulon:  was seized in August by the Royal Navy as a prize of war.
: The  was seized in August by the Royal Navy as a prize of war.
: The  was captured in December by the French with the breaking of the Siege of Toulon.
Sovereign: The ship was captured by a French privateer and sent to Charleston.
: Siege of Toulon: The 74-gun ship was seized in August by the Royal Navy as a prize of war.
Swift: The ship was captured by two French warships in the Grand Banks of Newfoundland and was sent into Brest.
 ( Royal Navy): The  was captured on 25 October by the French Navy's .
: Siege of Toulon:  was seized in August by the Royal Navy as a prize of war.
: The  was seized in August by the Royal Navy as a prize of war.
: The  was captured in December by the French with the breaking of the Siege of Toulon.
Traveller: The ship was captured in the Mediterranean sea by a French ship and sent into Marseille.
Two Brothers: The ship was captured by a French privateer and sent to Charleston.
Venus: The privateer schooner was captured by the Royal Navy, in the West Indies.
Vrouw Angina: The ship was captured by a French privateer and sent to a Norwegian port.
Vrouw Elizabeth Judity: The ship was captured while on a voyage from Archangelsk, Russia to Amsterdam and taken to Havre Le Grace, Seine-Maritime, France.
Vulture: The ship was captured and taken to Stavanger, Norway.
York: The ship was captured in the Mediterranean sea by a French ship and sent into Marseille.

1794
: Glorious First of June: The  was captured by the Royal Navy.
 ( Sardinian Navy): The  was captured on 10 June by the French Navy's Boudeuse.
 ( Royal Navy): Action of 6 November 1794: The 74-gun third rate was captured by the French Navy's .
Alliance: The ship was captured by the French while on a voyage from London to Jamaica.
: Glorious First of June: The  was captured by the Royal Navy's .
Ann: The ship was captured by the  while on a voyage from Loverpool to Africa. She was taken to L'Orient, Morbihan, France.
Apollo: The ship was captured by the French while on a voyage from Barbados to Lancaster, Lancashire. She was taken to a French port.
Ariadne: The ship was captured in the Mediterranean Sea by the French while on a voyage from London to Livorno. She was sent to Toulon, Var, France.
Atalanta: The ship was captured by the French while on a voyage from London to Jamaica.
Beaufoy: The ship was captured in the English Channel by the French and taken to a French port.
Bergen: The ship was captured by a French privateer off Cayenne, French Guiana while on a voyage from Amsterdam to Suriname.
Betsey: The ship was captured in the Mediterranean Sea by a French privateer and ordered to Genoa.
Betsey and Mary: The ship was captured by the French while on a voyage from Jersey, Channel Islands to Newfoundland, British North America.
Biens Aimée: The ship was captured at Bengal, India.
Bonetto ( Archduchy of Austria): The ship was captured by a French vessel and sent into Brest, Finistère, France.
Buop-Succes: The ship was captured by the French while on a voyage from Goa to Lisbon.
Cæsar: The ship was captured by a French ship of the line and was ordered into a French port but was wrecked on the French coast.
Charming Kitty: The ship was captured and sunk by a French frigate while on a voyage from Milford Haven, Pembrokeshire to Gibraltar.
Citoyen: The ship was captured off Pondicherry, India.
Colonel: The ship was captured by three French frigates while on a voyage from the Bahamas to Liverpool. She was taken to L'Orient.
Commerce: The ship was captured by a French vessel while on a voyage from Maryland to Amsterdam, Dutch Republic. She was sent in to Saint-Malo, Ille-et-Vilaine, France.
Copenhagen: The ship was captured by the French privateer Sans Culotte and sent to Martinique.
: Glorious First of June: The 80-gun ship was captured by the Royal Navy's .
De Vrouw Margaretha: The ship was captured and sunk by a French privateer while on a voyage from Groningen to London, Great Britain.
Diana: The ship was captured by the French in the North Channel and was sunk.
Diligence: The ship was captured by the French while on a voyage from Málaga, Spain to Cork.
Dispatch: The ship was captured by the French while on a voyage from Jersey to Oporto, Portugal.
Dryades: The ship was captured by the French while on a voyage from Bridport, Dorset to Quebec, British North America. She was taken to Brest, France.
: Action of 5 May 1794: The frigate was captured by the Royal Navy's .
Endeavour: The ship was captured in the North Sea off Flamborough Head, Yorkshire by a French brig cutter.
: Action of 23 April 1794: The  was captured by the Royal Navy's .
: The 15-gun brig-sloop was captured by the Royal Navy's .
Favourite: The ship was captured by a French vessel while on a voyage from Limerick, Ireland to London. She was sent to Brest, Finistère, France.
Fly The ship was captured by a French warship and taken to Virginia, United States.
Fly: The ship was captured by the French while on a voyage from Liverpool to San Sebastián, Spain.
Freedom: The ship was captured by the French while on a voyage from Cork to San Sebastián, Spain.
Friends: The ship was captured by the French while on a voyage from Mevagissey, Cornwall to Guernsey.
Friendship: The ship was captured in the North Sea while on a voyage from Sunderland, County Durham to Ostend, West Flanders, France. She was sent to Dunquerque, Nord.
Friendship: The ship was captured by the French while on a voyage from Dartmouth, Devon to Newfoundland.
George: The ship was captured on 1 January by a French frigate and sent to L'Orient, Morbihan.
Good Intent: The ship was captured by the French while on a voyage from Barcelona, Spain to London. She was taken to L'Orient.
Hannibal: The collier was captured on 14 December by the Minerve off "Ivica" while on a voyage from Liverpool to Naples.
Hero: The ship was captured by a French vessel and sent to Cherbourg, Seine-Maritime.
Hope: The ship was captured by the French and later recaptured and sent to Bermuda.
Hope: The ship was captured off Barbados on 9 November by the French privateer brig Le Peuple François while on a voyage from London to Grenada.
Horwood: The ship was captured by the French while on a voyage from Oporto to Dublin, Ireland.
: Glorious First of June: The  was captured by the Royal Navy's .
James: The ship was captured by the French and sunk while on a voyage from Oporto, Portugal to Limerick, Ireland.
James and Rebecca: The ship was captured by the French while on a voyage from Saint Vincent to London.
Jane: The ship was captured by the French while on a voyage from Swansea, Glamorgan to Oporto.
John and Margaret: The ship was captured on 16 July off the Isle of Lewis while on a voyage from Saint Petersburg, Russia to Cork, Ireland.
Juffrouw Alida: The ship was captured on 19 December in the North Sea off Great Yarmouth, Norfolk, Great Britain by a French ship. She was recaptured on 26 December by British fishermen.
Krageror: The ship was captured by a French frigate while on a voyage from Virginia, United States to Rotterdam, Dutch Republic. She was sent to Brest, Finistère, France.
Lady Jane: The ship was captured by the French in the North Sea off the Dogger Bank.
Law-Sacramento: The ship was captured by the French while on a voyage from Bengal to Lisbon.
Lewis: The ship was captured by the French while on a voyage from Cadiz to Newfoundland.
Mary: The ship was captured by the French while on a voyage from Guernsey, Channel Islands to Limerick, Ireland.
Mary: The ship was captured by the French while on a voyage from Dartmouth to Bilbao, Spain.
Mary Ann: The ship was captured on 16 August in the Atlantic Ocean by the  while on a voyage from tobago to London.
Mermaid: The ship was captured by a French vessel and sent into Brest.
 (: The 32-gun frigate was captured on 10 August by the Royal Navy.
Minerva: The ship was captured by the French while on a voyage from Gibraltar to London.
Nancy: The ship was captured by the French on 10 June while on a voyage from Bristol, Gloucestershire to an African port. She was taken into Brest.
 (: The 38-gun frigate was scuttled by the French at Saint-Florent, Corsica on 18 February. She was salvaged by the Royal Navy the next day and taken into service as HMS St Fiorenzo.
Nelly: The ship was captured by a French frigate while on a voyage from Memel, East Prussia to the River Clyde. She was set afire and sunk.
: Glorious First of June: The  was captured by the Royal Navy.
: Action of 23 April 1794: The 40-gun frigate was captured by the Royal Navy.
Peggy: The ship was captured by the French while on a voyage from Southampton, Waterford, Ireland.
Peggy: The ship was captured by the French while on a voyage from London to Grenada.
Perseverance: The ship was captured by the French while on a voyage from the Turks Islands to New Brunswick, British North America. She was taken to Providence, Rhode Island, United States.
: A French squadron captured the off the Bonny River between 23 and 29 December 1794.
Ranger: The ship was captured by the French while on a voyage from Barbados to London.
Rose: The ship was captured on 31 December by the French while on a voyage from Livorno to Leith, Lothian.
Sandown: The ship was captured in the Gulf of Mexico (on 18 July by the French privateer Guillotine.
: Glorious First of June: The  was captured by the Royal Navy's .
Severn: The ship was captured by the French while on a voyage from Bristol, Gloucestershire to New York, United States. She was taken to Brest, France.
: The  was captured on 17 June by the Royal Navy's .
: The  was captured on 21 October by the Royal Navy's .
Roman Emperor: The ship was captured by a French privateer and taken to Guadeloupe.
Sally: The ship was reported to have been captured then recaptured.
 ( Royal Navy): The  was captured on 9 June by the French Navy.
St. Antonia: The ship was captured by the French while on a voyage from Bengal to Lisbon.
: The brig was captured on 12 January by the Royal Navy's 
Susannah: The ship was captured by the French in October and sunk while on a voyage from London to a Portuguese port.
Le Venguer: The sloop was captured by the British Army at Saint-Pierre on 17 February 1794, during the Battle of Martinique.
Vrude: The ship was captured while on a voyage from Amsterdam to Bilbao, Spain. She was taken into Cherbourg, Seine-Maritime.
William: The ship was captured in the North Sea off Flamborough Head, Yorkshire by a French brig cutter while on a voyage from Riga, Latvia to Portsmouth, Hampshire.

1795
Achilles: The ship was captured by the French and taken into Bayonne, Pyrénées-Atlantiques, France while on a voyage from St. Andero, Spain to London.
Alfred : The ship was captured by the French privateer Le Brutus Français while on a voyage from Jamaica to London. She was taken to Charleston, South Carolina, United States.
Alice: The ship was captured by the French while on a voyage from Barbados to Liverpool, Lancashire. She subsequently foundered.
: 22 August: The 36-gun frigate was captured by the Royal Navy off Eigerøya, Norway.
Britainca: The snow was captured by a French schooner while on a voyage from Lisbon to Waterford. She was subsequently recaptured by the Royal Navy's .
Britannia:: A French privateer captured Britannia as she was on her way to the Caribbean with a cargo of slaves from West Africa.
Ann(): The ship was captured by the French and taken to Cadiz, Spain.
Anna: The ship was captured by a French privateer while on a voyage from Bristol, Gloucestershire to Jamaica.
Anna : The ship was captured by the French while on a voyage from Hull, Yorkshire, Great Britain to Salerno, Kingdom of Naples.
Argo: The ship was captured by the French while on a voyage from Baltimore, Maryland, United States to a Portuguese port. She was taken to Toulon, Var, France.
Ashley: The ship was captured in the Atlantic Ocean off Cape St. Vincent, Portugal on 23 September by the French and was sunk.
Bacchus: The ship was captured by ). She was taken to Bermuda.
Brothers: The ship was captured by the French and taken to Charlestown, South Carolina, United States.
 : The 10-gun brig was captured on 10 October by the Royal Navy's .
: Naval Battle of Genoa, 14 August: The 80-gun ship was captured by the Royal Navy's .
 ( Royal Navy): Action of 7 October 1795: The   was captured by the French Navy.
: Naval Battle of Genoa, 14 August: The  was captured by the Royal Navy.
  ( Royal Navy): The   was captured in October by the French Navy.
Columbus: The ship was captured by the French on 14 January while on a voyage from Cadiz, Spain to London. She was taken to a French port.
Concordia: The ship was captured in the North Sea by the French and taken to Ostend or Bruges.
: The 14-gun brig-sloop was seized by the Royal Navy as a prize of war.
Dom Successo: The ship was captured by the French while on a voyage from Bengal to Oporto.
Dove: The ship was captured in the Atlantic Ocean off Cape St. Vincent on 29 September by the French and was sunk. She was on a voyage from Poole, Dorset to Faro, Portugal.
Dragon : The ship was captured by the British at La Plata, Viceroyalty of the Río de la Plata.
Elizabeth: The ship was captured by the French and taken into Bayonne while on a voyage from Trieste to Amsterdam, Batavian Republic.
Drumiate ( Kingdom of Sicily): The ship was captured by the  while on a voyage from Sicily to London. She was taken to Toulon, Var.
Eliza: The ship was captured by a British frigate while on a voyage from France to the United States. She was taken to the Bahamas.
Elizabeth: The sloop was captured by a French privateer in the Windward Passage while on a voyage from Jamaica to St. Domingo.
Elizabeth: The ship was captured by the French and sunk while on a voyage from New York to London.
Formidable: Battle of Groix, 23 June: The  was captured by the Royal Navy.
Frederick: The ship was captured in the North Sea by the French and taken to Ostend or Bruges.
Friendship: The ship was captured by the French while on a voyage from Saint Petersburg, Russia to Gibraltar.
George: The ship was captured by a French privateer while on a voyage from Halifax, Nova Scotia, British North America to Jamaica. She was taken to St. Domingo.
Helena : The ship was captured in February by the French while on a voyage from Saint Petersburg, Russia to Lisbon, Portugal. She was taken to L'Orient.
Hendrick: The ship was captured in the North Sea by the French and taken to Ostend or Bruges.
Hope: The ship was captured off Vigo, Spain by a French privateer and was taken to Bayonne, Loire-Atlantique, France.
: The  was captured on 14 February by the Spanish Navy.
James : The ship was captured by a French privateer while on a voyage from Savannah, Georgia to Saint Thomas, Virgin Islands.
Jean: The ship was captured by a French frigate while on a voyage from Lisbon, Portugal to Glasgow, Renfrewshire. She was subsequently recaptured by her crew and arrived at Glasgow.
John: The ship was captured by the French while on a voyage from Barcelona, Spain to Liverpool. She was taken to Brest.
Joseph: The ship was captured on 8 March by the  while on a voyage from Halifax, Nova Scotia, British North America to London.
Latitia : The ship was captured in the Mediterranean Sea by a French privateer while on a voyage from "Zant" to London. She was taken to Livorno.
: The corvette was captured by a British squadron led by Admiral Warren.
Little Ben: The ship was captured by the French while on a voyage from Liverpool, Lancashire to an African port.
Lucy: The schooner was captured by the French in the Windward Passage while on a voyage from Jamaica to St. Domingo.
Mary: The ship was captured by the French while on a voyage from a Cornish port to Venice.
Pomona: The ship was captured in the Atlantic Ocean off Cape St. Vincent on 26 September by the French.
Mermaid: The ship was captured by the French while on a voyage from Jamaica to Savannah, Georgia, United States. She was taken to Charleston.
Momus: The sloop was captured by the French and sent to a French port.
Monmouth: The ship was captured by the French on or before 5 February.
Nancy: The ship was captured by the French while on a voyage from Oporto, Portugal to Liverpool, Lancashire. She subsequently foundered.
Nelly: The ship was captured by the French while on a voyage from San Domingo to Jamaica.
Nostra Senora da Arrabida: The ship was captured by the French while on a voyage from Lisbon to Bengal.
: The 64-gun ship was captured on 22 October by the Royal Navy.
Phyn : The ship was captured off Cuba on 23 January by the French privateer General Laveaux. She was sent to Charleston, South Carolina, United States, arriving on 19 February.

Pique: The 38-gun fifth rate frigate was captured on 4 January by the Royal Navy's .
Pickmans: The ship was captured in the North Sea by the French and taken to Ostend or Bruges.
Pomona: The ship was captured in the Atlantic Ocean off Cape St. Vincent on 29 September by the French and was sunk.
Providence: The ship was captured by the French and taken into Rochefort, Charente-Maritime, France while on a voyage from.
Queen: The ship was captured on 7 March by the  while on a voyage from Tenerife, Canary Islands to London.
Richard: The ship was captured by the French and taken to L'Orient, Morbihan.
Richard: The ship was captured by six privateers while on a voyage from New Providence, New Jersey, United States to Liverpool. She was taken to a South Carolina port.
Rosamund: The ship was captured by the French while on a voyage from New Brunswick, British North America to Jamaica. She was taken to St. Domingo.
Russia Merchant: The ship was captured by the French while on a voyage from Bristol, Gloucestershire to the West Indies. She was taken to Brest, Finistère, France.
San Bernando: The ship was captured by the French while on a voyage from Santander, Spain to Falmouth, Cornwall Kingdom of Great Britain. She was subsequently recaptured and arrived at Falmouth.
: The  was captured by the Royal Navy's .
St. Antonion: The ship was captured by the French while on a voyage from Lisbon to Bengal.
Susannah: The ship was captured by the French while on a voyage from Newfoundland, British North America to Vigo, Spain.
Talbot: The ship was captured by the French and taken into Bayonne while on a voyage from Falmouth, Cornwall to the Barbary Coast.
Thomas: The schooner was captured by the French while on a voyage from London to Grenada. She was taken to Brest.
: Battle of Groix, 23 June: The  was captured by the Royal Navy's .
Unity: The ship was captured by the French while on a voyage from Oporto to Liverpool. She subsequently foundered.
Unity: The ship was captured by the French while on a voyage from Oporto to Southampton, Hampshire. She was taken to Brest.
: The corvette was captured in October in the Irish Sea by a British privateer. She subsequently foundered in a storm with the loss of all hands.
Vrouw Magdalena: The ship was captured in the North Sea by the French and taken to Ostend or Bruges.
William: The ship was captured by a French privateer while on a voyage from New Brunswick, British North America to the West Indies.
William and Mary: The ship was captured by the French while on a voyage from Madeira, Portugal to Barbados. She was taken to St. Croix.

1796
Adolph: The ship was captured by the Royal Navy while on a voyage from Amsterdam, Batavian Republic to Cadiz, Spain. She was taken to Sheerness, Kent.
Amazon: The ship was captured on 29 December by a French squadron and sunk.
Ann: The ship was captured by the Spanish while on a voyage from Newfoundland, British North America to Naples, Kingdom of Sicily. She was taken to Carthagena, Spain.
Betsey: The ship was captured in the Atlantic Ocean while on a voyage from Halifax, Nova Scotia, British North America to Jamaica. She was taken into Aux Cayes, Hispaniola.
: Capitulation of Saldanha Bay on 17 August 1796: The 54-gun ship was captured by the Royal Navy.
Britainca: The snow was captured by a French schooner while on a voyage from Lisbon to Waterford. She was subsequently recaptured by the Royal Navy's .
Brothers: The ship was captured by the French while on a voyage from London to Faial, Portugal. She was taken into L'Orient, Seine-Maritime.
Diana: The brig was captured in the English Channel off Falmouth, Cornwall by a French frigate.
: Capitulation of Saldanha Bay on 17 August 1796,: The 64-gun ship was captured by the Royal Navy.
Elizabeth: The ship was captured in the Mediterranean Sea while on a voyage from London to Naples, Kingdom of Sicily. She was taken to "Ferrajo".
Eliza of Cornwall: The ship was captured by a Dutch privateer.
Endeavour: The ship was captured in the Atlantic Ocean off the coast of Africa by a French privateer and was taken into Gorée.
Ferret: The ship was captured on 31 January by the French privateer Carmagnole while on a voyage from Jamaica to Liverpool, Lancashire. She was taken to Havana, Cuba.
Fortitude: The ship was captured by a French privateer while on a voyage from Jamaica to London. She was subsequently recaptured by the Royal Navy's  and sent to Falmouth, Cornwall.
Fortune: The ship was captured in the English Channel off Dartmouth, Devon by a French privateer. She was set afire and sunk.
Friendship: The ship was captured while on a voyage from Lisbon to an English port. She was taken to L'Orient, Charente-Maritime.
Friendship: The ship was captured in the English Channel by a French privateer on 2 October while on a voyage from Weymouth, Dorset to London. She was later recaptured and taken to Portsmouth. The privateer was also captured.
Good Samaritan: The ship was captured by the French.
Governor Parr: The ship was captured in the Atlantic Ocean by the French while on a voyage from Jamaica to Nova Scotia, British North America.
Harrison: The brig was captured off the Isle of Wight by a French privateer, but was subsequently recaptured and taken to Cowes.
: Capitulation of Saldanha Bay on 17 August 1796: The 64-gun ship was captured by the Royal Navy.
Hope: The ship was captured in the Windward Passage while on a voyage from New Brunswick, British North America to Jamaica. She was recaptured but was the captured again by the French.
Hope: The ship was captured by the French while on a voyage from Bristol, Gloucestershire to Jamaica.
Hope: The ship was captured by the French privateer L'Hirondelle.
James and Mary: The ship was captured by the French while on a voyage from Bangor to London. She was taken to Fécamp, Seine-Maritime, France.
James and William: The brig was captured by a French schooner while on a voyage from Lisbon to Liverpool.
Jengularre: The ship was captured by a Guernsey-based privateer and was taken to Plymouth, Devon.
John and Thomas: The ship was captured in the Atlantic Ocean off Land's End, Cornwall by a French privateer on 30 September.
Lavinia: The ship was captured by a French frigate while on a voyage from Oporto, Portugal to Cork, Ireland. She was taken to L'Orient.
Live Oak: The ship was captured by the French privateer L'Hirondelle while on a voyage from Lisbon to Liverpool.
: The  was captured on 20 April by the Royal Navy's .
Margaret: The ship was captured by the  while on a voyage from Leith, Lothian to Lisbon, Portugal. She was set afire and sank.
Maria: The ship was captured by the French while on a voyage from Africa to the West Indies. She was taken to Saint Martin.
Martinico: The ship was captured in the Mediterranean Sea by the French while on a voyage from "Sassee" to Lisbon, Portugal. She was taken to Salice, Corsica.
Mary Ann: The ship was captured by a French privateer while on a voyage from Dublin to Jamaica and was taken to Aux Cayes.
Mary Gracie: The ship was captured by the French.
Mentor: The ship was captured in the Atlantic Ocean off the coast of Africa by a French privateer and was taken into Gorée.
Nile: The ship was captured by a French privateer while on a voyage from the Current Islands to London. She was taken into Tunis, Beylik of Tunis.
Nostra Senora de Arabida: The ship was captured in the Indian Ocean by the French while on a voyage from Bengal to Lisbon. She was taken to Mauritius.
Nostra Senora de Pedude de St. Antonio: The ship was captured by the Spanish while on a voyage from Rio de Janeiro to Oporto. She was taken to Vigo, Spain.
Pacific: The ship was captured by the Royal Navy's  and sentto Falmouth, Cornwall.
Proserpine: The  was captured on 13 June by the Royal Navy's .
Ranger: The ship was captured off Barbados by a French privateer.
: Capitulation of Saldanha Bay on 17 August 1796: The sloop was captured by the Royal Navy.
Tamise: The  was captured on 8 June by the Royal Navy's .
Thomas and Ellen: The sloop was captured on 18 March by a French privateer.
Thomas and Sarah: The ship was captured on 22 April by the French privateer Adventure while on a voyage from Ancona, Kingdom of Sicily to an English port.
Three Sisters: The ship was captured in the Atlantic Ocean by a Dutch squadron.
: Capitulation of Saldanha Bay on 17 August 1796: The 54-gun ship was captured by the Royal Navy.
Unité: The  was captured on 11 April by the Royal Navy's .
Unitey: The ship was captured by a French privateer off the coast of Norway while on a voyage from Danzig, Prussia to the Firth of Forth. She was taken to Ostend, West Flanders, France.
Vine: The ship was captured by the French while on a voyage from Cork to the West Indies. She was taken to Guadeloupe.
William: The ship was captured in the North Sea by a French privateer. and taken to Bergen, Norway.
: The 64-gun ship was captured on 19 January by the Royal Navy.

1797
: Battle of Camperdown 11 October: The 68-gun ship was captured by the Royal Navy.
Ahoy: The ship was captured by the French in the West Indies She was later recaptured and taken to Tortola.
Alegria: The ship was captured by the French while on a voyage from a Brazilian port to Oporto.
Alert: The ship was captured by the French while on a voyage from Liverpool, Lancashire to Africa.
Alfred: The ship was captured in the Irish Sea by the French while on a voyage from Bristol, Gloucestershire to Limerick, Ireland.
: Battle of Camperdown, 11 October: The 54-gun ship was captured by the Royal Navy.
Antigua: The sailing barge was captured by the French while on a voyage from St. Vincent to London. She was taken in toe L'Orient, Seine-Maritime, France.
: The 16-gun brig-sloop was captured on 10 January by the Royal Navy's .
Bea Fi: The ship was captured by the French while on a voyage from a Brazilian port to Oporto.
Bernardo: The ship was captured by the French while on a voyage from a Brazilian port to Oporto.
Brothers: The ship was captured by the Spanish while on a voyage from a Cornish port to Naples, Kingdom of Sicily. She was taken to Algeciras, Spain.
Calypso: The ship was captured by a French frigate, set afire and sunk. She was on a voyage from Lisbon to London.
Carolina: The ship was captured by the French while on a voyage from a Brazilian port to Oporto.
Draper: The ship was captured and sunk by the French. She was on a voyage from Oporto to Dublin, Ireland.
Duke of Cumberland: The ship was captured on 6 November by Spanish Frigates. She was taken to the River Plata.
Eliza: The ship was captured in the North Sea off the coast of Lincolnshire by the French privateer Enterprize. She was subsequently released.
Elizabeth and Peggy: The ship was captured in the Irish Sea by the French while on a voyage from Limerick to London.
Enigheten: The ship was captured by the French while on a voyage from a Cornish port to Naples. She was taken to Genoa.
: The 70-gun ship was captured by the French Navy.
Eider Stroman: The ship was captured in the English Channel by the British privateer Lottery while on a voyage from Bayonne, Pyrénées-Atlantiques to Saint-Malo, Ille-et-Vilaine. She was taken to Jersey, Channel Islands.
Elizabeth: The ship was captured by the French while on a voyage from Savannah, Georgia, United States to Jamaica. She was taken to St. Jago de Cuba.
: The 66-gun ship was captured by the French Navy.
Fame: The ship was captured by a French privateer while on a voyage from Virginia, United States to Oporto.
: Battle of Camperdown, 11 October: The 64-gun ship was captured by the Royal Navy.
George: The ship was captured by the French while on a voyage from Martinique to London. She was taken to Curaçao.
: The ship was captured by the French Navy.
: Battle of Camperdown, 11 October: The 64-gun ship was captured by the Royal Navy.
Hampshire: The ship was captured on 2 January by the French privateer Patriot while on a voyage from London to Jamaica. She was taken to Brest, Finistère, France.
: The 74-gun ship was captured by the Royal Navy's .
 ( Royal Navy): The 32-gun fifth rate was taken over by mutineers on 22 September and handed to the Spanish Navy five days later.
Hero: The ship was captured by the French while on a voyage from Grenada to Liverpool. She was taken to Saint Croix.
Hope: The ship was captured by a French privateer while on a voyage from Falmouth, Cornwall to Guernsey, Channel Islands.
Hopewell: The ship was captured by a French privateer while on a voyage from London to Antigua. She was later retaken by her crew and arrived at Portsmouth, Hampshire. The privateer was captured and taken to Appledore, Devon.
James: The ship was captured by the French while on a voyage from Liverpool to Jamaica. She was taken to Saint Martin.
John: The ship was captured by the French while on a voyage from New Brunswick, British North America to Jamaica. She was taken to a Cuban port.
She was taken to Great Yarmouth, Norfolk.
La Justine Adelaide: The privateer was captured in the English Channel off Fécamp, Seine-Maritime by the Royal Navy's  . She was taken to Deal, Kent, Great Britain.
Kitty: The ship was captured by the French while on a voyage from an Indian port to Philadelphia, Pennsylvania, United States. She was taken to a Puerto Rican port.
London Packet: The ship was captured in the North Sea off Buchan Ness, Aberdeenshire on 11 September by the French privateer Jason. She was on a voyage from Archangelsk, Russia to Portsmouth.
Mansel: The ship was captured in the English Channel by a French privateer while on a voyage from Weymouth, Dorset to King's Lynn, Norfolk.
Margaret: The ship was captured by the French while on a voyage from Jamaica to Liverpool. She was taken to St. Jago de Cuba.
Mary: The ship was captured by the French in the Atlantic Ocean off Charleston, South Carolina, United States while on a voyage from London to Savannah, Georgia. She was taken to Port-de-Paix, Hispaniola.
Mary: The ship was captured by the French in the West Indies while on a voyage from Demerara to Liverpool. She was later recaptured.
: The 70-gun ship was captured by the French Navy.
Minerva: The ship was captured by the French.
Modena Delz: The ship was captured by the French while on a voyage from a Brazilian port to Oporto.
Neptune: The ship was captured by Forbes ( while on a voyage from Surinam to Amsterdam. She was sent to Martinico.
Néréide  A Sybille class 36-gun, copper-hulled, frigate of the French Navy. Captured 22 December 1797 by HMS Phoebe. 
Oak: The ship was captured by the French while on a voyage from Lisbon to London. She was taken to Ostend, West Flanders, France.
Pallas: The ship was captured by the French off Charleston while on a voyage from the Clyde to Charleston. She was taken to Port-aux-Paix.
Patrouina: The ship was captured by the French while on a voyage from a Brazilian port to Oporto.
Peggy: The ship was captured by the French while on a voyage from Jamaica to an American port. She was taken to Havana, Cuba.
Piodade: The ship was captured by the French while on a voyage from a Brazilian port to Oporto.
Pomona: The ship was captured by the French while on a voyage from Maryland to Saint Domingo She was taken into Léogâne, Hispaniola.
Roa Nova: The ship was captured by the French while on a voyage from a Brazilian port to Oporto.
Sally: The ship was captured by the French and taken to Guadeloupe.
: The 70-gun ship was captured by the French Navy.
San Joaquim: The ship was captured by the French while on a voyage from a Brazilian port to Oporto.
: Battle of Cape St Vincent, 14 February: The 114-gun first rate was captured by the Royal Navy's .
: Battle of Cape St Vincent, 14 February: The 80-gun third rate was captured by the Royal Navy's .
Santa Cruz: The ship was captured by the French while on a voyage from a Brazilian port to Oporto.
St. Nicholas: The ship was captured by a Royal Navy squadron under the command of Lord Hugh Seymour. She was taken to Portsmouth, Hampshire, Great Britain.
St. Teràza: The ship was captured by the French while on a voyage from a Brazilian port to Oporto.
Swallow: The ship was captured and sunk by a French privateer. She was on a voyage from Barbados to Newfoundland, British North America.
: The frigate was captured on 5 January by the Royal Navy's .
Tattler: The ship was captured by the French.
Trinidade: The ship was captured by the French while on a voyage from a Brazilian port to Oporto.
: The 6-gun privateer schooner was captured on 2 April by the Royal Navy's .
Truenzo: The ship was captured by the French while on a voyage from a Brazilian port to Oporto.
: Battle of Camperdown, 11 October: The 70-gun ship was captured by the Royal Navy.
: The 70-gun ship was captured by the French Navy.
: Battle of Camperdown, 11 October: The 64-gun ship was captured by the Royal Navy.
Weston: The ship was captured by the French.
William: The ship was captured by the French while on a voyage from Liverpool to Martinique. She was taken to Cayenne, French Guiana.

1798
Alexander: The ship was captured by a French privateer while on a voyage from Lancaster to Savannah, Georgia, United States. She was taken to Guadeloupe.
Alfred: The ship was captured by a French privateer while on a voyage from Lisbon, Portugal to Liverpool, Lancashire She was taken to a French port.
 ( Royal Navy): Action of 14 December 1798: The 32-gun fifth-rate was captured by the French Navy's .
American Eagle: The ship was captured by the French while on a voyage from Charleston, South Carolina to London. She was taken to Saint-Martin, Île de Ré, Finistère, France.
Ann: The ship was captured in the North Sea off Filey, Yorkshire on 10 November by a French privateer.
Apollo: The ship was captured by a French privateer while on a voyage from Virginia, United States to London. She was taken to a French port.
: Battle of the Nile, 1–3 August:  was captured by the Royal Navy.
Brave: The privateer was captured on 24 April by the Royal Navy's .
Aurora: The ship was captured by the French while on a voyage from Liverpool to Pillau, East Prussia. She was taken to Arendal, Norway.
Barbara: The ship was captured by the French while on a voyage from Liverpool to the West Indies. She was taken to Guadeloupe.
Betsey: The brig was captured while on a voyage from Liverpool to New York. She was later recaptured and taken to Halifax, Nova Scotia, British North America.
Betsey: The ship was captured of the coast of Africa on 3 June by the  while on a voyage from Liverpool to an African port.
Brothers: The ship was captured by a privateer off Oporto. She was on a voyage from Newfoundland, British North America to Oporto.
 ( Royal Navy): The 8-gun schooner was captured on 16 October by the French privateer Enfant Prodigue.
: Captured by a French privateer.
Columbus: The ship was captured by the French privateer L'Antoinette while on a voyage from New York, United States to Amsterdam, Batavian Republic. She was taken to La Rochelle, Charente-Maritime, France.
:Battle of the Nile, 1–3 August: The  was captured by the Royal Navy's .
 ( Royal Navy): The  ran aground at Vlieland, Netherlands and was seized by the Dutch as a prize of war.
Dart: The ship was captured by a privateer off Oporto, Portugal.
Dione: The brig was captured by the French privateer Racoon.
: The 36-gun fifth rate was captured on 24 August by the Royal Navy.
Dorothea Elizabeth: The ship was captured by the French ship Severn while on a voyage from Saint-Thomas, Virgin Islands to Havana, Cuba. She was taken to Môle-Saint-Nicolas, Hispaniola.
Endeavour: The ship was captured by the French while on a voyage from Southampton, Hampshire to "Tentris". She was taken to Saint-Malo, Ille-et-Vilaine.
Endeavour: The ship was captured while on a voyage from Newfoundland to a British port. She was later recaptured and taken to Dartmouth, Devon.
: The 10-gun cutter was captured by the Royal Navy.
: The 18-gun sloop was captured by the Royal Navy.
Flora: The ship was captured while on a voyage from Martinico to Dublin, Ireland. She was later recaptured and taken to Jersey, Channel Islands.
: Battle of the Nile, 1–3 August: The  was captured by the Royal Navy.
Freedom: The ship was captured by the French privateer Dragon while  on a voyage from Archangelsk, Russia to London. She was taken to Bergen, Norway.
: The privateer was captured by the Royal Navy's .

: Action of 24 October 1798: The frigate was captured by the Royal Navy's .
Gantil: The ship was captured by the Guernsey privateer Resolution.
General Gray: The ship was captured by the French while on a voyage from the South Seas to London. She was taken to a French port.
Good Intent: The ship was captured by a French privateer while on a voyage from London to Galway, Ireland. She was later recaptured by the American privateer Atlantic.
: Battle of the Nile, 1–3 August: The  was captured by the Royal Navy and was burnt as she was too severely damaged to be of use.
: The  was captured on 21 April by the Royal Navy's .
: Battle of Tory Island, 12 October: The  was captured by the Royal Navy.
: Battle of Tory Island, 12 October: The  was captured by the Royal Navy's .
Jamaica: The ship was captured by a privateer. She was later retaken by her crew and taken to St. Domingo.
Jane: The ship was captured by a French privateer while on a voyage from Virginia, United States to London. She was taken to a French port.
Jean: The ship was captured by the French while on a voyage from Liverpool to Virginia, United States. She was taken to Puerto Rico.
Kelper: The ship was captured by the Dutch while on a voyage from Danzig, Prussia to London. She was taken to Vlissingen, Zeeland, Batavian Republic.
Lark: The ship was captured by the French privateer Racoon.
( Royal Navy): Action of 18 August 1798: The  was captured by the French Navy's .
Le Brave: The privateer was captured by the Royal Navy's . She was taken to Plymouth, Devon.
L'Invincible General Bonaparte: The 20-gun privateer was captured on 9 December by the Royal Navy's .
Lydia: The ship was captured by the French while on a voyage from Charleston, South Carolina to "Hambro'". She was taken to Brest, Finistère, France.
Mary: The ship was captured by a French privateer while on a voyage from Newfoundland to the West Indies. She was taken to Guadeloupe.
: Battle of the Nile: The  ran aground and was captured on 1 August by the Royal Navy's . She was set afire and burnt.
 ( Royal Navy): The ship-sloop was captured in September at Puerto Padre, Cuba, by three Spanish frigates.
Nancy: The ship was captured by the French while on a voyage from Liverpool to the West Indies. She was later recaptured by the Guernsey privateer Alarm.
Nanine: The ship was captured by the Guernsey privateer Resolution.
Neutrality: the ship was captured by a French privateer while on a voyage from Baltimore, Maryland, United States to Bremen. She was later recaptured by the Guernsey privateer Dispatch and taken to Plymouth, Devon.
Ocean: The ship was captured by the Spanish while on a voyage from Bengal to Philadelphia, Pennsylvania, United States. She was taken to a Puerto Rican port.
Peep of Day: The ship was captured by a privateer off Oporto.
: Battle of the Nile, 1–3 August: The  was captured by the Royal Navy.
Phillippa: The ship was captured by a privateer off Oporto.
Pigou: The ship was captured by a French frigate while on a voyage from Philadelphia, Pennsylvania, United States to China. She was taken to Nantes, Loire-Atlantique, France.
Poplar: the ship was captured by the French while on a voyage from Grenada to Martinico. She was taken to Guadeloupe.
Prince of Wales: The ship was captured in the Atlantic Ocean on 11 October by the French privateer La Confiance while on a voyage from Bristol to the West Indies. She was recaptured later that day by the British privateer King Pepple and taken to King's Road.
Quaker: The ship was captured by the French while on a voyage from Africa to Jamaica. She was taken to Guadeloupe.
Racoon: The privateer was captured by the Royal Navy's . She was taken to Portsmouth.
: Battle of Tory Island, 12 October: The  was captured by the Royal Navy's .
Sally: The ship was captured by the French and taken to Puerto Rico. She was later burnt.
Maltese ship San Giovanni ( Maltese Navy): The 64-gun third rate was surrendered on 11 June to the French Navy.
: Action of 15 July 1798: The frigate was captured by the Royal Navy's .
 ( Maltese Navy): Mediterranean campaign of 1798: The 64-gun ship was surrendered on 11 June to the French Navy.

Sante Elisabeth ( Maltese Navy): The 32-gun frigate was surrendered on 11 June to the French Navy.
Sophie: The ship was captured by the Guernsey privateer Resolution.
: Battle of the Nile, 1–3 August: The  was captured by the Royal Navy.
St. Johannes: The ship was captured while on a voyage from Boston, Massachusetts to Naples, Kingdom of Sicily.
Superb: The ship was captured by the French while on a voyage from Charleston, South Carolina, United States to London. She was taken to Bayonne, Ille-et-Vilaine.
Surprize: The ship was captured on 8 December by a French privateer.
Swallow: The ship was captured by a French privateer while on a voyage from Lisbon to Newfoundland.
Three Friends (flag unknown): The ship was captured by the British while on a voyage from Havana, Cuba to Hambro'. She was taken to Halifax, Nova Scotia, British North America.
: Battle of the Nile, 1–3 August: The  was captured by the Royal Navy.
: The aviso was captured at Abukir on 25 August by the Royal Navy's .
Ultima Sperranza ( Grand Duchy of Tuscany): The ship was captured by the Spanish while on a voyage from India to Livorno. She was taken to Algeciras, Spain.
: The 20-gun corvette was captured on 7 August by the Royal Navy's .
Vine: The ship was captured while on a voyage from Virginia, United States to London. She was later recaptured by the British privateer Marquis of Townsend and taken to Jersey, Channel Islands.
Venus: the ship was captured by the Spanish while on a voyage from London to Saint Thomas, Virgin Isles. She was taken to a Puerto Rican port.
: Action of 24 October 1798: The frigate was captured by the Royal Navy's .
William and John: The ship was captured by a Spanish privateer while on a voyage from New Brunswick, British North America to Jamaica. She was taken to a Hispaniolan port.
William and Thomas: The ship was captured by the French while on a voyage from the Clyde to Savannah, Georgia, United States. She was taken to Guadeloupe.

1799
Abigail: The ship was captured on 15 October by the French privateer Vengeance while  on a voyage from a Virginian port to Bremen. She was recaptured on 20 October by the Royal Navy's  and sent in to Plymouth, Devon, Great Britain.
Active: The ship was captured, then recaptured and was taken to Lisbon.
Active: The ship was captured while on a voyage from Charleston, South Carolina to London.
Admiraal de Ruyter: The 68-gun ship was captured on 16 November in the North Sea off Texel, North Holland by the Royal Navy.
: The 14-gun xebec was captured on 22 February by the Royal Navy's .
Alarm: Vlieter Incident: The 24-gun ship was captured on 28 August in the North Sea off the Dutch coast by the Royal Navy.
Alceste: The  was captured on 18 June by the Royal Navy's .
: The brig was captured on 17 June by the Royal Navy's .
Ambuscade: The 32-gun ship was captured on 16 November in the North Sea off Texel by the Royal Navy.
Amphitrite: The 44-gun ship was captured on 16 November in the North Sea off Texel by the Royal Navy.
Anacréon: The privateer brig was captured on 26 June by the Royal Navy's .
Anna Maria: The ship was captured by the Spanish while on a voyage from Altona to Saint-Thomas, Virgin Islands. She was taken to Tenerife, Spain.
: The  was captured on 10 October by the Royal Navy's .
Astrea: The ship was captured on 8 November by the French privateer Scipio. She was recaptured on 10 November by the Royal Navy's .
Atlas: The ship was captured by a French privateer while on a voyage from Genoa to Liverpool. Lancashire. She was taken in to Copto, Spain.
Aurora: The ship was captured in the Strait of Sunsa by a French privateer.
: Vlieter Incident 30 August: The 54-gun ship was captured by the Royal Navy.
Belle Antoinette: Vlieter Incident: The 44-gun ship was captured on 28 August in the North Sea off the Dutch coast by the Royal Navy.
Bonafide: The ship was captured by the French in the English Channel. She was taken into Saint-Malo, Ille-et-Vilaine, France.
Brabant: The ship was captured by the French while on a voyage from Lisbon to Liverpool. She was taken in to Bordeaux, Pyrénées-Atlantiques.
: Vlieter Incident, 30 August: The 54-gun ship was captured by the Royal Navy.
: Vlieter Incident 30 August: The 54-gun ship was captured by the Royal Navy.
She was recaptured later that day by the Royal Navy's .
Catherina ( Hamburg): The brig was captured by the Spanish. She was recaptured on 24 December by the Royal Navy's .
: Vlieter Incident 30 August: The 64-gun ship was captured by the Royal Navy.
Charles: The ship was captured by the French. She was taken to Bordeaux, Pyrénées-Atlantiques, France.
Chateau Margo: The ship was captured while on a voyage from Oporto to Limerick, Ireland. She was later recaptured and taken in to Lisbon.
Cleopatra: The ship was captured by the French while on a voyage from Lisbon to Liverpool. She was taken in to Bordeaux.
Concord: The ship was captured off the coast of Africa.
Constitution: Vlieter Incident: The 44-gun ship was captured on 28 August in the North Sea off the Dutch coast by the Royal Navy.
Columbus: The ship was captured by the French. She was taken to Bordeaux.
Commerce: The brig was captured by the Spanish. She was recaptured on 27 December by the Royal Navy's .
Courier: The ship was captured in March in the Mediterranean Sea by the Royal Navy's .
Creeping Kate: The ship was captured by the Spanish while on a voyage from Jamaica to Cork. She was taken in to a Cuban port.
Delaware: The ship was captured by a French privateer while on a voyage from Philadelphia, Pennsylvania to Port du Passage. She was taken in to Saint Andero.
Delight: The ship was captured while on a voyage from London to Peterhead, Aberdeenshire. She was taken in to Arendal, Norway.
Diussee: Vlieter Incident: The 44-gun ship was captured on 28 August in the North Sea off the Dutch coast by the Royal Navy.
Dragon: The ship was captured, then recaptured and was taken to Lisbon.
Dreighorlahn: Vlieter Incident: The East Indiaman was captured on 28 August in the North Sea off the Dutch coast by the Royal Navy.
Duchess of Gordon: The ship was captured off Oporto by the French privateer Le Deuble a Quatee while on a voyage from Newfoundland, British North America to Oporto. She was taken in to Bordeaux, Loire-Atlantique, France. She was recaptured on 25 December by the Royal Navy's .
Duncombe: The ship was captured by a French privateer while on a voyage from Danzig, Prussia to London. She was taken in to Ostend, West Flanders, France.
Eagle: The ship was captured by the Spanish and was taken in to St. Ubes.
Echo: The ship was captured on 8 April by a French privateer while on a voyage from Poole to Newfoundland, British North America. She was subsequently recaptured by Mate ( and taken in to Plymouth, Devon.
Elizabeth: The ship was captured by the French. She was later recaptured and sent in to Plymouth.
Eenroon: The ship was captured, by the Royal Navy's  and was taken to Lisbon.
Endeavour: The ship was captured, then recaptured and was taken to Lisbon.
Expedition: Vlieter Incident: The 44-gun ship was captured on 28 August in the North Sea off the Dutch coast by the Royal Navy.
Favourite: The ship was captured while on a voyage from St. Michael's Mount, Cornwall to London. She was recaptured by a Jersey privateer and sent in to St. Ives, Cornwall.
Felicidad: The privateer was captured on 24 December by the Royal Navy's .
Ferret: The privateer was captured on 25 December by the Royal Navy's . She was taken in to Falmouth, Cornwall.
Flora: The ship was captured by the French while on a voyage from Rotterdam to Belfast, Ireland. She was taken into Calais, France.
Flora: The ship was captured by the Spanish while on a voyage from Dublin, Ireland to Oporto, Portugal.
Follock: Vlieter Incident: The 24-gun ship was captured on 28 August in the North Sea off the Dutch coast by the Royal Navy.

: The  was captured on 1 March off the coast of Bengal by the Royal Navy's .
 ( Royal Navy): The 18-gun sloop was captured by the French Navy.
Fortune: The ship was captured by the British Revenue Cutter .
Foudroyant: The privateer was captured in the Atlantic Ocean by the Royal Navy's . She was taken to Cork, Ireland.
Fox: The ship was captured on 7 April by the French privateer Courageux while on a voyage from Charleston, South Carolina, United States to Bilbao, Spain.
Friendship: The ship was captured by the French. She was sent in to Saint-Malo.
Galathea: The 16-gun ship was captured on 16 November in the North Sea off Texel by the Royal Navy.
Gelderland: The 68-gun ship was captured on 16 November in the North Sea off Texel by the Royal Navy.
General Prescot: The ship was captured by the Spanish. She was recaptured by the Royal Navy's  but four Spanish Navy frigates recaptured her again. She was taken in to a Spanish port.
Good Union: The privateer was captured in the Mediterranean Sea by the French. She was taken in to Toulon, Var, France.
Harlequin: The ship was captured on 28 October while on a voyage from Liverpool to Martinico.
Harriet: The ship was captured while on a voyage from Liverpool to Africa. She was subsequently recaptured by the Royal Navy's  and sent in to Cork, Ireland.
Hanover: The ship was captured by the Spanish while on a voyage from Venice to and English port. She was taken in to Málaga, Spain.
Harmony : The ship was captured on 22 December by the French while on a voyage from Philadelphia, Pennsylvania to the West Indies. She was taken in to Guadeloupe.
Hazard: The ship was captured by the French. She was sent in to Paimpol, Finistère, France.
Hazard: The ship was captured, bit was later recaptured by the British ship Mona.
Hector: Vlieter Incident: The 44-gun ship was captured on 28 August in the North Sea off the Dutch coast by the Royal Navy.
Helder: Vlieter Incident: The 32-gun ship was captured on 28 August in the North Sea off the Dutch coast by the Royal Navy.
Herel: The ship was captured by the French. She was sent in to Ostend, West Flanders, France.
Hero: The ship was captured by a French privateer.
Heron: The ship was captured, then recaptured and was taken to Lisbon.
Hevle Reill: The ship was captured by the Royal Navy's . She was taken in to Kinsale, County Cork, Ireland.
Hirondelle: The privateer was captured in March in the English Channel 9 leagues ( north west of the Île de Batz, Finistère by the Royal Navy's .
Hope: The ship was captured while on a voyage from Newfoundland to London.
Howda: Vlieter Incident: The East Indiaman was captured on 28 August in the North Sea off the Dutch coast by the Royal Navy.
Hunter: The privateer schooner was captured by the Royal Navy, in the West Indies.
: The corvette was captured on 20 August in the Atlantic Ocean off Surinam by the Royal Navy.
: The 12-gun sloop-of-war was captured on 6 August in the Atlantic Ocean off the coast of Portugal by the Royal Navy's .
Johanna: The ship was captured by the French. She was taken to Bordeaux.
John: The ship was captured, then recaptured and was taken to Lisbon.
John: The ship was captured by the French while on a voyage from Great Yarmouth, Norfolk to Poole, Dorset. She was taken in to Boulogne.
John: The ship was captured by the French while on a voyage from Oporto, Portsmouth to Newfoundland, British North America. She was taken in to Bordeaux, Pyrénées-Atlantiques.
John and Elizabeth: The ship was captured by the French while on a voyage from Dungarvan, County Waterford, Ireland to Poole, Dorset.
: The cutter was captured on 20 August in the Atlantic Ocean off Surinam by the Royal Navy.
Alerte: The ship was captured on 18 June in the Mediterranean Sea by the Royal Navy.
Courageuse: The ship was captured on 18 June in the Mediterranean Sea by the Royal Navy.
La Dame de Grace: The ship was captured on 18 March in the Mediterranean Sea by the Royal Navy's ).
La Dangereuse: The ship was captured on 18 March in the Mediterranean Sea by the Royal Navy's ).
La Fondre: The ship was captured on 18 March in the Mediterranean Sea by the Royal Navy's ).
: The ship was captured on 18 June in the Mediterranean Sea by the Royal Navy.
: The ship was captured on 18 June in the Mediterranean Sea by the Royal Navy.
La Maria Rose: The ship was captured on 18 March in the Mediterranean Sea by the Royal Navy's ).
La Négresse: The ship was captured on 18 March in the Mediterranean Sea by the Royal Navy's ).
Résolue: The privateer was captured on 31 March by the Royal Navy's . She was taken in to Plymouth, Devon.
: The ship was captured on 20 August in the Bay of Biscay by the Royal Navy's .
Layr: The ship was captured by the French. She was sent in to Boulogne, Pas-de-Calais, France.
: The  was captured on 3 March by Turko-Russian forces at Corfu and returned to the Royal Navy.
Le Bordeloes: The privateer was captured by the Royal Navy's . She was taken in to Plymouth.
Le Grand Feraillard: The privateer was captured on 11 October by the Royal Navy's .
L'Épervier: The ship was captured in March by the Royal Navy's .
Les Deux Frères: The ship was captured on 18 March in the Mediterranean Sea by the Royal Navy's ).
L'Espérance: The privateer was captured on 22 December in the Atlantic Ocean off Viana do Castelo, Portugal by the Royal Navy's .
Le St. Jacques: The ship was captured on 13 September in the English Channel off L'Orient, Ille-et-Vilaine by the Royal Navy's .
: Vlieter Incident, 30 August: The 64-gun floating battery was captured by the Royal Navy.
Liguria: The ship was captured on 7 August in the Mediterranean Sea by the Royal Navy's .
L'Insurgente  Captured by USS Constellation 9 February 1799.
Lion: The brig was captured by the French She was sent into Boulogne.
Liveley: The ship was captured on 9 November by a Spanish privateer off the coast of Berbice while on a voyage from Africa to the West Indies.
Lydia: The ship was captured by the French. She was subsequently wrecked on The Olives rocks.
Lynx: The 12-gun ship was captured on 9 October in the Ems by the Royal Navy's  and HMS Hawke.
Margaret: The ship was captured by the Spanish while on a voyage from Newfoundland, British North America to a Portuguese port.
Marianne: The ship was captured on 18 March in the Mediterranean Sea by the Royal Navy's ).
Mars: The 44-gun ship was captured on 16 November in the North Sea off Texel by the Royal Navy.
Mary: The ship was captured by the Spanish while on a voyage from the Clyde to Charleston, South Carolina, United States. She was taken in to the Passage Islands.
Mary: The ship was captured by the French while on a voyage from London to Texel, North Holland, Batavian Republic. She was taken in to Calais.
Mary Campbell: The ship was captured by the Spanish while on a voyage from the Clyde to New Providence, New Jersey, United States. She was taken in to the Passage Islands.
Matilda: The ship was captured off the coast of Africa.
Minerva: The ship was captured by the French while on a voyage from Cork, Ireland to Tortola. She was later recaptured by the Royal Navy's  and taken in to Falmouth, Cornwall.
Minerva: Vlieter Incident: The 24-gun ship was captured on 28 August in the North Sea off the Dutch coast by the Royal Navy.
Nancy: The ship was captured by the Spanish while on a voyage from London to New Providence, New Jersey, United States. She was taken in to a Puerto Rican port.
Nancy: The ship was captured while on a voyage from Dingle, County Cork, Ireland to Lisbon, Portugal. She was later recaptured and arrived at Dingle.
Nostra Señora de la Soledade: The ship was captured by the Royal Navy's . She was taken in to Plymouth, Devon.
Pallas: The ship was captured by the French. She was taken to Bordeaux.
Patrick: The ship was captured by the French on 12 January while on a voyage from Dublin to Oporto She was set afire and sunk.
Peggy: The ship was captured while on a voyage from Lisbon, Portugal to Dublin, Ireland. She was taken in to "Camarines".
Pelican: The brig was captured by the French on 30 January in the English Channel off Start Point, Devon. She was recaptured on 3 February by the Royal Navy's  and taken to Plymouth, Devon.
HMS Penelope ( Royal Navy): The 18-gun ship was captured on 7 July by the Spanish Navy's .
Perseus: The 12-gun ship was captured on 9 October in the Ems by the Royal Navy's  and HMS Hawke.
Phoenix: The 14-gun ship was captured in July in the West Indies by the Royal Navy's .
Plumper: The ship was captured off the coast of Africa.
Polly: The sloop was captured by the French. She was sent into Port-Blanc, Côtes-du-Nord, France.
Polly: The brig was captured on 16 October off A Coruña, Spain by the Royal Navy's  while on a voyage from Marblehead, Massachusetts to Bilbao, Spain. She was taken in to Plymouth.
Princess Amelia: The ship was captured on 20 January by the French privateer Spartiate. She was set afire and sunk.
: The French privateer Malartic captured Princess Royal in October or November 1799 off the coast of Sumatra.
: The  was captured on 9 February by the Royal Navy's .
Rebecca: The privateer was captured on 27 April in the Atlantic Ocean 20 leagues ( west of Ouessant, Finistère by the Royal Navy's .
: The felucca was captured on 26 June in the Atlantic Ocean off Surinam by the Royal Navy.
: The frigate was captured by the Royal Navy's  while on a voyage from Cayenne, French Guiana to Surinam.
Rosa ( Hamburg): The ship was captured by a privateer in the North Sea off the coast of the Batavian Republic.
Sally: The ship was captured while on a voyage from Lisbon to Oporto, Portugal.
Sans Quartier: The privateer was captured on 9 April in the English Channel off Chausey, Manche by the Royal Navy's .
Santa Antonio: The 14-gun ship was captured on 23 June in the Mediterranean Sea by the Royal Navy's .
She was taken in to Plymouth, Devon, Great Britain.
: The 32-gun fifth rate was captured on 25 October by the Royal Navy's .
: The 42-gun frigate was captured on 6 February in the Mediterranean Sea by the Royal Navy's .
Seaforth: The ship was captured by a French privateer while on a voyage from New York, United States to Barbados. She was subsequently wrecked on 6 August on Tortuga.
Snarke: The ship was captured by the French while on a voyage from Bristol, Gloucestershire to London. She was taken in to Boulogne.
Somerset: The ship was captured on 17 November in the English Channel off Weymouth, Dorset by a French privateer while on a voyage from Poole, Dorset to Liverpool. She was late recaptured by a cutter from Weymouth.
St. Antonio y Animas: The privateer, a schooner, was captured on 25 December by the Royal Navy's .
Stockport: The ship was captured by the French.
Sultana: The ship was captured by the Spanish while on a voyage from London to Lisbon. she was taken in to Vigo, Spain.
Susannah: The ship was captured in the English Channel off Dartmouth, Devon by a French privateer while on a voyage from Dartmouth to Torbay, Devon. She was recaptured and brought into Brixham, Devon.
: The cutter was captured in the Bay of Biscay by the Royal Navy's . She was taken to Plymouth, Devon.
Swift: The ship was captured while on a voyage from Gibraltar to Guernsey, Channel Islands. She was later recaptured by the Royal Navy's  and ).
: The 40-gun frigate was captured on 16 October by the Royal Navy's .
Three Friends: The ship was captured, then recaptured and was taken to Lisbon.
Tuley: The ship was captured on 29 November by the French privateed Vengeance. She was taken in to Bordeaux.
Ucca Cardagora: The 12-gun ship was captured in March in the West Indies by the Royal Navy's . She was set afire and burnt.
Undaunted: The ship was captured on 13 August in the North Sea off the Dutch coast by boats from the Royal Navy's .
Unie: Vlieter Incident: The 44-gun ship was captured on 28 August in the North Sea off the Dutch coast by the Royal Navy.
Union: The ship was captured by the French. She was taken to Bordeaux.
Urwachten: Vlieter Incident: The 66-gun ship was captured on 28 August in the North Sea off the Dutch coast by boats from the Royal Navy.
Utrecht: The 68-gun ship was captured on 16 November in the North Sea off Texel by the Royal Navy.
Vengeur: The privateer was captured on 24 November by the Royal Navy's .
Valk: The 20-gun ship was captured in November in the Zuyder Zee by the Royal Navy.
Vengeance: The ship was captured on 14 August in the North Sea off the Dutch coast by boats from the Royal Navy's . She was set afire and sunk.
Venus: Vlieter Incident: The 24-gun ship was captured on 28 August in the North Sea off the Dutch coast by the Royal Navy.
Vreedelust: Vlieter Incident: The East Indiaman was captured on 28 August in the North Sea off the Dutch coast by the Royal Navy.
Vriendschap: The ship was captured by the Spanish while on a voyage from Amsterdam to Lisbon, Portugal. She was taken in to Vigo, Spain.
:  Vlieter Incident, 30 August: The 70-gun ship was captured by the Royal Navy.
Willcock: The ship was captured by the Spanish while on a voyage from Liverpool to Livorno. She was taken in to Algeciras, Spain.
 ( Royal Navy): The 14-gun ship was captured in the Mediterranean Sea by two Spanish gunboats.
Young Jonah: The ship was captured off the coast of Africa.

1800
A.B.C.: The ship was captured in the English Channel by a French privateer. She was subsequently recaptured by the Royal Navy's  and taken in to Plymouth, Devon, Great Britain.
Abigail: The ship was captured by the French. while on a voyage from Halifax, Nova Scotia, British North America to London.
Acteon: The ship was captured by the Spanish. She was taken in to Oporto, Portugal.
Active: The ship was captured by the French privateer Mars.
Active: The ship was captured by the French privateer Ferrailleur while on a voyage from Liverpool, Lancashire to Boston, Massachusetts, United States. She was later recaptured by the Guernsey privateer Dublin Volunteer.
Active: The ship was captured by a privateer while on a voyage from Bermuda to London. She was recaptured by the Royal Navy's  and sent to Cork, Ireland.
Active: The ship was captured by the Dutch while on a voyage from Whitby, Yorkshire to London. She was taken in to a Dutch port.
Adelphi : The ship was captured by the French while on a voyage from the Leeward Islands to Falmouth, Cornwall. She was taken in to Bordeaux, Loire-Atlantique, France.
Adjutor Dahl: The ship was captured by the Guernsey privateers Alarm and Marquis of Townsend while on a voyage from St. Andero to Lisbon. She was taken in to Guernsey.
Adrihoa: The ship was captured by the French off the coast of Africa.
Adventure: The ship was captured off Oporto.
Africa: The ship was captured by a number of Spanish gunboats while on a voyage from Gibraltar to Livorno. She was taken in to Algeciras, Spain.
Africa: The ship was captured by two French privateers while on a voyage from Demerara to London. She was taken in to Guadeloupe.
Ajax : The ship was captured by the Spanish and was sent in to St. Andero, Spain.
 ( Royal Navy): The 14-gun brig was captured on 22 November by her crew in a mutiny and surrendered the next day to the Spanish Navy.
Albion : The ship was captured by a French privateer on 16 March in the English Channel off the Isle of Wight. She was on a voyage from London to Plymouth, Devon.
Alert: The ship was captured by Spanish gun boats off Gibraltar while on a voyage from Naples, Kingdom of Sicily to Bristol, Gloucestershire.
Alkmonack: The ship was captured by the French while on a voyage from London to Charleston, South Carolina, United States. She was taken in to Bordeaux, Loire-Atlantique, France.
Amelia  (flag unknown): The ship was captured and taken in to Jamaica while on a voyage from Vera Cruz to Hamburg.
Amiable Elenore: The ship was captured while on a voyage from Lisbon, Portugal to Venice.
Amicitia: The ship was captured by the Spanish while on a voyage from Lisbon to Livorno. She was taken in to Algeciras, Spain.
Amity : The ship was captured on 12 March by a French privateer while on a voyage from Charleston, South Carolina to London.
Amphitrite: The ship was captured by the French off the coast of Africa.
Andorida: The ship was captured by the French galiot LAbeille.
Ann: The ship was captured by the French while on a voyage from St. Croix, Virgin Islands to Aux Cayes, Hispaniola. She was taken in to St. Domingo.
Ann: The ship was captured by a French privateer. She was taken in to Málaga, Spain.
Ann: The ship was captured by the French while on a voyage from St. Croix to Aux Cayes and return. She was taken in to Santo Domingo, Hispaniola.
Apollo: The ship was captured by the Spanish. She was taken in to Oporto, Portugal.
Ariadne: The ship was captured by thwe Spanish while on a voyage from Charleston, South Carolina to Liverpool, Great Britain. She was taken in to St. Andero, Spain.
Arrogant: The ship was captured by the Spanish while on a voyage from St. Ube's to Limerick. She was taken in to a Spanish port.
Athénien: Siege of Malta (1798–1800): The Royal Navy seized the 64-gun third rate as a prize of war.
Augusta (flag unknown): The ship was captured by the Royal Navy's  while on a voyage from Archangelsk, Russia to London. She was taken in to Cuxhaven.
Augustus: The ship was captured in the North Sea by the French privateer Le Marengo.
Aurora: The ship was captured by the British while on a voyage from Virginia to Cartagena, Spain. She was taken in to Jamaica.
Aurora: The ship was captured while on a voyage from "Zant" to Hull, Yorkshire. She was later recaptured and taken in to Gibraltar.
Austrias: The ship was captured by the British while on a voyage from Laguira, Cuba to Philadelphia, Pennsylvania. She was taken in to Port Royal, Jamaica.
Bacchus: The ship was captured by the French privateer Vengeance while on a voyage from Newhaven, East Sussex to Guernsey, Channel Islands. She was taken in to Cherbourg, Seine-Maritime, France.
Balladore: The ship was captured while on a voyage from Lisbon, Portugal to London.
Bardon: The ship was captured on 9 November in the North Sea by a French privateer.
Beaver : The schooner was captured on 27 March by a French privateer and was sunk by her.
Bee: The ship was captured by a number of Spanish gunboats off Gibraltar while on a voyage from Newcastle-upon-Tyne, Northumberland to Gibraltar.
Betsey: The ship was captured by the British privateer Mayflower while on a voyage from Amsterdam to Lisbon, Portugal and was taken in to Guernsey, Channel Islands.
Betsey: The ship was captured by a French privateer.
Betsey ( British North America): The ship was captured by the French privateer LAuguste.
Bee: The ship was captured off Jamaica by the Spanish and was sent in to a Cuban port.

Bellona: The ship was captured by two French privateers while on a voyage from London to Jamaica. She was later recaptured and arrived at Jamaica.
: The ship was captured on 12 October by the United States Navy's . She was subsequently repaired and returned to the French.
Berwick : The ship was captured by the French privateer Perseverant while on a voyage from Leith, Lothian to London.
Bilboa: The ship was captured off Oporto while on a voyage from London to Oporto.
Bom Success e Expedicao: The ship was captured by the French while on a voyage from Lisbon to China. She was taken in to Mauritius.
Boreas: The ship was captured by the Spanish between 28 October and 30 November. She was taken in to Bologna, Spain.
Bouganville : The privateer was captured by the Royal Navy's . She subsequently collided with her and foundered.
Britannia: The ship was captured by the French privateer LAuguste while on a voyage from New Brunswick, British North America to Hamburg. She was later recaptured by the Royal Navy's HMS Bury and taken in to Gibraltar.
Briton: The ship was captured on 16 November by a French privateer, She was taken in to Boulogne, France.
Brothers: The ship was captured by the Spanish while on a voyage from Liverpool to Oporto, Portugal. She was taken in to Vigo, Spain.
Brothers: The ship was captured on 12 August off Bermuda by the French privateer Bellona while bound to Halifax, Nova Scotia, British North America.
Brownlow: The ship was captured by a French [privateer while on a voyage from London to Belfast, County Down, Ireland. She was taken in to Paimpol, Côtes-du-Nord, France.
Buffalo : The ship was captured by the French while on a voyage from Newcastle-upon-Tyne, Northumberland to Hamburgh. She was taken in to Ostend, West Flanders, France.
Caldwell: The ship was captured by the French privateer La Rage while on a voyage from Quebec to London.
Cam's Delight: The ship was captured by the French while on a voyage from Africa to Bristol, Gloucestershire.
Carolina: The ship was captured on 12 November by the Royal Navy's  and was sent in to Great Yarmouth, Norfolk, Great Britain.
Caroline ( Jersey): The ship was captured on 14 April by the French privateer Le Diable Quatre while on a voyage from Jersey to Quebec. She was subsequently recaptured by the Royal Navy's  and taken in to Plymouth, Devon.
Caroline: The ship was captured by two Spanish privatters while on a voyage from Jamaica to Vera Cruz.
Caroline: The ship was captured by the Spanish while on a voyage from Newfoundland to Oporto, Portugal. She was later recaptured by the Portuguese and taken in to Viana, Portugal.
Carteret : The ship was captured by the French while on a voyage from Jamaica to Falmouth, Cornwall. She was taken in to Bordeaux, Loire-Atlantique, France.
Cazadol: The ship was captured by the British privateer Mayflower while on a voyage from Bordeaux, France to Ferrol, Spain. She was sent in to Guernsey, Channel Islands.
Ceres: The ship was captured on 27 May by the French privateer LHeureux. She was recaptured on 8 June and was taken in to the Isles of Scilly.
Ceres: The ship was captured by the Dutch privateer Braave while on a voyage from Glasgow, Renfrewshire to Charleston, South Carolina, United States. She was later recaptured by the Royal Navy's  and taken in to Plymouth, Devon.
Charlotta: The ship was captured by the Royal Navy's  while bound for New York, United States. She was taken in to Halifax, Nova Scotia, British North America.
Charlotte: The ship was captured by the Spanish. She was taken in to Palma, Mallorca, Spain.
Charlotte: The ship was captured by a French privateer while on a voyage from Halifax, British North America to London. She was taken in to a Spanish port.
Charlotte: The ship was captured by the French while on a voyage from Cork to Jamaica. She was taken in to Guadeloupe.
Christian: The ship was captured by a Dutch privateer while on a voyage from London to Montrose, Forfarshire.
Columbia: The ship was captured by the French while on a voyage from New Orleans, French Louisiana to Hambro'. She was sent in to Jamaica.
Columbia: The ship on 6 January in the Atlantic Ocean by a French privateer while on a voyage from Virginia to Great Britain1.
Columbia ( Guernsey): The ship was captured off Gibraltar.
Commercial: The ship was captured in the North Sea off Coquet Island, Northumberland on 26 October by the French privateer La Mouche. She was taken in to Bremen.
Commerce: The ship was captured off Oporto, Portugal. She was subsequently recaptured by the Royal Navy's .
Concord: The ship was captured by the French while on a voyage from China to America. She was taken in t Isle de France.
Concord ( Jersey): The French privateer La Grand Decide captured Concord while Concord was on a voyage from Jersey, Channel Islands to Newfoundland, British North America.  La Grand Decide  took Concord in to a French port.
: Action of 4 August 1800: The  was captured off the coast of Brazil by the Royal Navy's .
George: The ship was captured by a privateer in the West Indies.
Convenienta: The ship was captured by the Guernsey privateers Alarm and Marquis of Townsend while on a voyage from St. Andero to Lisbon. She was taken in to Guernsey.
Cortis: The ship was captured by the Royal Navy's  and was sent in to Lisbon, Portugal.
Countess of Bute: The ship was captured by the French privateer La Brave while on a voyage from Newfoundland to Naples, Kingdom of Sicily.
Countess of Lauderdale: The ship was captured in the Atlantic Ocean by the French privateer Gersonge while on a voyage from the West Indies to London.
Cultivator: The ship was captured by the French privateer Minerve while on a voyage from Demerara to London. She was recaptured by the Royal Navy's .
Dædalus: The ship was captured while on a voyage from Portsmouth, Hampshire to the West Indies. She was later recaptured and taken in to Antigua.
Dart: The ship was captured by the French while on a voyage from New York to the West Indies. She was taken in to Guadeloupe.
Deb: The ship was captured by the Spanish while on a voyage from Faro, Portugal to Gibraltar. She was taken in to Cadiz, Spain.
Defiance: The brig was captured in the English Channel on by the French privateer Hero. She was later recaptured by the Royal Navy's  and taken in to Plymouth, Devon.
Dégo: Siege of Malta (1798–1800): The 64-gun ship was seized by the Royal Navy on 4 September as a prize of war.
 ( Royal Navy): The 20-gun corvette was captured on 14 March in a mutiny by her crew and was handed over to the French Navy the next day.
Der Gute Wind ( Hamburg): The ship was captured by a British privateer while on a voyage from Spain to Hamburg. She was taken in to Gibraltar.
Diana: The ship was captured while on a voyage from the Cape of Good Hope to London. She was later recaptured and taken in to Antigua.
Diamond: The ship was captured on 27 October by the French privateer Le Grand Decide while on a voyage from Halifax, Nova Scotia, British North America to Portsmouth, Hampshire. She was taken in to a French port.
Dick: The ship was captured on 15 October by the French privateer La Grand Decide while on a voyage from Liverpool, Lancashire to Africa.  recaptured Dick on 16 October.
Diligence: The ship was captured in the North Sea.
Dispatch: The ship was captured by the French off Benin and sunk.
Dolphin: The ship was captured by Dutch while on a voyage from Great Yarmouth, Norfolk to Cuxhaven. She was taken in to Texel, Batavian Republic.
Dorset: The ship was captured on 16 November in the North Sea off Cromer, Norfolk by the French privateer Chasseur, She was taken in to Boulogne, or Dunquerque. France.
Dublin Packet: The ship was captured by the French while on a voyage from New York, United States to Livorno. She was taken in to Cadiz, Spain.
Duke of Athol: The ship was captured while on a voyage from Danzig, Prussia to London. She was later recaptured and taken in to Scarborough, Yorkshire.
Duke of Kent : The ship was captured on 12 February by the French privateer LAnuge while on a voyage from Halifax to Liverpool.
Duke of Kent: The French privateer Le Grande Decide captured Duke of Kent on 27 October. Her captors plundered and then released her.
Duke of York: The ship was captured off Gibraltar.
Eagle: The ship was captured by the French privateer Victor Hugues while on a voyage from the Clyde to Jamaica.
Eagle: The ship was captured by the French privateer Le Brave while bound for Quebec.
Echo: The ship was captured by a French privateer while on a voyage from New York to Montserrat. She was taken in to Saint Barthélemy.
Edward: The ship was captured in the North Sea on 12 November by the French privateer Le Marengo and was sunk by her.
Eight Brothers: The privateer was captured in the North Sea off Vlissingen, Batavian Republic by the British privateer Lady Ann. She was taken in to Great Yarmouth, Norfolk.
El Belos: The ship was captured on 11 August by the Royal Navy's  while on a voyage from Havana, Cuba to A Coruña. She was taken in to Plymouth, Devon, Great Britain.
El Feliz: The ship was captured by the Portuguese while on a voyage from A Coruña to Vera Cruz. She was taken in to Lisbon, Portugal.
Elisabeth : The ship was captured by the French privateer Bougainville while on a voyage from Lisbon, Portugal to Liverpool. She was later recaptured by the Royal Navy's .
Eliza: The ship was captured by the Royal Navy's  while on a voyage from Charleston, South Carolina to Santo Domingo. She was taken in to Jamaica.
Eliza : The ship was captured on 24 March by a French privateer while bound for Lisbon. She was sent in to La Rochelle.
Eliza: The ship was captured on 12 August off Bermuda by the French privateer Bellone while on a voyage from Dublin to Oporto, Portugal. She was taken in to St. Andero, Spain.
Elizabeth: The ship was captured by a French privateer while on a voyage from Jamaica to London. She was recaptured by the Royal Navy's  and taken in to Dover, Kent.
Elizabeth: The ship was captured by the Spanish while on a voyage from Newfoundland to Lisbon, Portugal. She was taken in to A Coruña.
Elizabeth: The ship was captured on 12 A while on a voyage from London to Amsterdam, Batavian Republic. She was taken in to Great Yarmouth, Norfolk.
Ellison: The ship was captured in the North Sea on 12 November by the French privateer Le Marengo and was sunk by her.
El Marte: The ship was captured while on a voyage from Vera Cruz, United Kingdom of Portugal, Brazil and the Algarves to Cadiz, Spain. She was sent in to Lisbon.
El Roi Carlos: The ship was captured on 17 September by the Royal Navy's  while on a voyage from Havana, Cuba to Spain. She was taken in to Plymouth, Devon, Great Britain.
: The ship was captured by the Royal Navy's .
Emilie: The ship was captured by the French privateer La Cybille. She was later taken by the Royal Navy's .
Emilie: The schooner was captured by the Royal Navy's  and  while on a voyage from Bordeaux to Guadeloupe. She was taken in to Plymouth, Devon, Great Britain.
Emma: The ship was captured by the French while outbound from Swanage, Dorset. She was later recaptured by the Royal Navy's  and taken in to Plymouth, Devon.
Endeavour : The ship was captured by a French privateer while on a voyage from Newfoundland to Figueiras, Portugal.
Endeavour: The ship was captured by the Spanish between 28 October and 30 November. She was taken in to Bologna, Spain.
Enterprize: The ship was captured by the French off Benin and sunk.
Experiment: The ship was captured while on a voyage from Grenada to London. She was taken in to St. Martins.
Fairy: The ship was captured by the French privateer La Renominee while on a voyage from Lancaster to the West Indies. She was taken in to Guadeloupe.
Fame: The ship was captured by four Spanish privateers while on a voyage from Cork, Ireland to Portugal. She was taken in to Vigo, Spain.
Fame : The ship was captured by the French while on a voyage from Southampton, Hampshire to Jersey.
Fame: The ship was captured by a French privateer while on a voyage from San Sebastián, Puerto Rico to Charlestown. She was later retaken by her crew and went ib to Jamaica.
Fancy: The ship was captured while on a voyage from New York to Martinique. She was taken in to St. Martins.
Fancy de Jersey ( Jersey): The ship was captured by a French privateer while on a voyage from Guernsey, Channel Islands to Leith, Lothian. She was later recaptured off Gorey, Jersey by the Royal Navy's  and taken in to Yarmouth, Isle of Wight.
Fanny: The brig was captured by the British while on a Voyage from Saint-Domingue, Hispaniola to Baltimore, Maryland. She was taken in to Jamaica.
Farn: The privateer was captured by the Guernsey privateer Mayflower and was taken in to Guernsey.
Favourite: The ship was captured in the Atlantic Ocean off Cape Ortegal, Spain by the Royal Navy's  while on a voyage from Cayenne, French Guiana to Bordeaux, Loire Atlantique.
Fedre Lunder ( Denmark-Norway): The ship was captured by a British privateer and was taken in to The Downs.
Felicidade da Silva: The ship was captured by a French privateer while on a voyage from Port Passage to Lisbon. She was taken in to Vigo, Spain.
Ferrailleur: The privateer was captured by the Guernsey privateer Mayflower and was taken in to Guernsey.
Field: The ship was captured in the Ems while on a voyage from Emden, Holy Roman Empire to Hull, Yorkshire. She was taken in to Delfzijl, Batavian Republic.
Flora: The ship was captured while on a voyage from Liverpool to Jamaica. She was later recaptured and arrived at Jamaica. Flora was captured a third time and sent in to Málaga, Spain.
Fortune: The ship was captured by a French privateer. She was taken in to Málaga, Spain.
Fox: The ship was captured by the Spanish while on a voyage from Cork to Oporto, Portugal. She was taken in to Vigo, Spain.
Fraternity: The ship was captured by the French privateer Mars.
Free Briton: The ship was captured on 16 November in the North Sea off Cromer, Norfolk by the French privateer Chasseur. She was taken in to Boulogne, France.
Friendship : The ship was captured and was sent in to Terschelling, Friesland, Batavian Republic.
Friendship: The ship was captured off Gibraltar.
Friendship : The ship was captured by the French while on a voyage from Newcastle-upon-Tyne, Northumberland to Guernsey.
Friendship: The ship was captured by the French and was taken in to Cadiz, Spain.
Friendship: The ship was captured on 30 November in the Atlantic Ocean by the Spanish privater Nostra Señora del Carmen. She was taken in to Vigo, Spain.
 ( Royal Navy): The cutter was captured on 2 June by the French privateer .
: The cutter was captured in September by the Royal Navy.
Gannet: The ship was captured on 12 December in the North Sea by a French privateer.
Generalinde: The ship was captured by the British while on a voyage from Saint Croix, Virgin Islands to Havana, Cuba and returne. She was taken in to Bermuda.
General Massina: The corvetto was captured by the Royal Navy's . She was taken in to Barbados.
: Battle of the Malta Convoy, 18 February: The  was captured by the Royal Navy.
Generous Planter: The ship was captured by the French privateer LEole while on a voyage from London to Jamaica. She was taken in to Brest, Finistère, France.
George: The ship was captured while on a voyage from Savannah, Georgia to St. Thomas, Virgin Islands. She was later recaptured and sent in to Charleston, South Carolina.
George: The ship was captured by a privateer in the West Indies.
George and Mary : The sloop was captured by a French privateer on 28 May off the Isle of Wight.
Gram : The ship was captured by the French and was sent in to Brest.
Goodhope: The ship was captured by the Spanish while on a voyage from Gibraltar to Lisbon, Portugal. She was taken in to Algeciras, Spain.
Good Intent: The ship was captured on 26 January by the Dutch in the North Sea off Sunderland, County Durham and was scuttled.
Good Intent: The ship was captured by a Spanish privateer while on a voyage from London to Lisbon, Portugal.
: The privateer brig was captured on 29 August by the Royal Navy.
: Action of 31 March 1800: The  was captured by the Royal Navy.
Gute Erwarting: The ship was captured while on a voyage from Danzig to London, Great Britain. She was recaptured by the Royal Navy's  and taken in to Great Yarmouth, Norfolk, Great Britain.
Gypsey: The ship was captured while on a voyage from Martinico, West Indies to Liverpool, Lancashire. She was later recaptured and taken in to Plymouth, Devon.
Haabet: The ship was captured by the British. She was taken in to Jamaica.
Hardy: The privateer was captured by the Royal Navy's . She was taken in to Plymouth, Devon, Great Britain.
Hebe: The ship was captured by a privateer on 11 November while on a voyage from Newfoundland to Teignmouth, Devon. She was later recaptured by the Royal Navy's  and taken in to Plymouth, Devon.
Hero: The ship was captured off Bermuda by a privateer. She was later recaptured by the United States Navy and taken in to St. Kitts.
Hiram: The ship was captured on 13 September in the Atlantic Ocean by the French privateer Courier. She was sent in to Cayenne, French Guiana.
Hope: The ship was captured while on a voyage from Newfoundland, British North America to Portugal. She was taken in to "Vivera".
Hope: The ship was captured by a French privateer while on a voyage from New York to Jamaica. She was taken in to Guadeloupe.
Hope: The ship was captured by the French while on a voyage from Emsworth, Hampshire to London.
Hope: The ship was captured by the Spanish off Havana, Cuba while on a voyage from British Honduras to London.
Hope: The ship was captured in the English Channel off Dover, Kent while on a voyage from Liverpool to London. She was taken in to Calais, France.
Hope: The ship was captured on 16 November in the North Sea off Cromer by the French privateer Chasseur. She was taken in to Dunquerque, France.
Hope: The Portsmouth-registered ship was captured by the Spanish between 28 October and 30 November. She was taken in to Bologna, Spain.
Hope: The Poole-registered ship was captured by the Spanish between 28 October and 30 November. She was taken in to Bologna.
Hoyden: The ship was captured on 7 January by the French privateer Le Rage while on a voyage from Newofoundland to Dartmouth, Devon.
Hope: The ship was captured in the North Sea off Montrose, Forfarshire.
Hunter: The ship was captured while on a voyage from Newfoundland, British North America to Lisbon, Portugal. She was later recaptured and arrived at Lisbon.
Impregnable: The privateer was captured off the Dutch coast.
Industry: The ship was captured in the North Sea off Flamborough Head, Yorkshire. She was later recaptured by the British lugger Phœnix and taken in to Bridlington, Yorkshire.
Inverness: The ship was captured by a privateer while on a voyage from Irvine, Ayrshire to Limerick, Ireland. She was later recaptured by the British sloop Spey and sent in to Falmouth, Cornwall.
Jamaica : The ship was captured by the French off St. Lucia while on a voyage from Cork, Ireland to Martinico, West Indies. She was ordered in to Guadeloupe but was recaptured by the Royal Navy's HMS Experiment and taken in to Bermuda.
Jane: The ship was captured on 18 March in the Atlantic Ocean by the French privateer Vengeance. She was recaptured on 25 March off Cape Finisterre, Spain by the Royal Navy's .
Jane: The ship was captured by a French privateer and was taken in to Málaga, Spain.
Jane: The ship was captured while on a voyage from Liverpool, Lancashire to Africa. She was subsequently recaptured by the British ships Herriot and Trident and taken in to Liverpool.
Jane and Sarah: The ship was captured by a French navy frigate and sunk while on a voyage from Newfoundland to Lisbon.
Jenny: The ship was captured by the French while on a voyage from Madeira, Portugal to Cork, Ireland. She was later recaptured by the Royal Navy's .
Jersey : The ship was captured by a French privateer while on a voyage from Newfoundland to Ireland.
Johannes: The ship was captured by the Royal Navy's . She was sent in to Portsmouth, Hampshire, Great Britain.
John and Mary: The ship was captured in the North Sea.
Jonge Wilhelm: The ship was captured by the French while on a voyage from London to Dordrecht. She was sent in to Vlissingen.
Josephus: The ship was captured by the Spanish while on a voyage from Lisbon to Livorno. She was taken in to Cadiz, Spain.
Juno: The ship was captured by a French privateer.
Juno: The ship was captured by a French privateer while on a voyage from Newfoundland to London. She was sent in to a French port.
Jupiter: The ship was captured while on a voyage from Martinico to London. She was taken in to St. Martin's.
Juliana: The brig was captured by the British privateer Alert while on a voyage from Bordeaux, Loire-Atlantique, France to Senegal. She was taken in to Weymouth, Dorset, Great Britain.
Keeling: The ship was captured by the French while on a voyage from Liverpool to London. She was taken in to a French port.
L'Actiff: The privateer was captured in the Bay of Biscay off Bordeaux, Loire-Atlantique by the Royal Navy's . She was taken in to Plymouth, Devon, Great Britain.
La Constance: The privateer was captured by the  Guernsey privateer Cynthia and taken in to Guernsey.
La Dorine: The brig was captured by the Jersey privateer Phoenix.
Lady Harewood: The ship was captured on 1 January in the Atlantic Ocean by the French privateer Volunteer. She was sent in to Nantes, Loire-Atlantique, France.
La Fortune: The privateer was captured by the Royal Navy's  and was sent in to The Downs.
La Jean: The brig was captured by the Jersey privateer Phoenix.
La Mouche: The privateer was captured by the Royal Navy's HMS Minerva.
Lancaster: The ship was captured on 17 June in the Atlantic Ocean by the French privateer Brave while on a voyage from Savannah, Georgia, United States to Lancaster, Lancashire. She was later recaptured by the Royal Navy's  and sent in to Falmouth, Cornwall.
La Paix: The ship was captured by the Royal Navy's . She was taken in to Portsmouth, Hampshire, Great Britain.
La Rancine: The privateer was captured by the Royal Navy's .
Lark: The ship was captured by the Spanish and was taken in to Vigo, Spain.
Latona: The ship was captured while on a voyage from Memel, East Prussia to Lisbon. She was later recaptured by the British privateer Earl Spencer and taken in to  Oporto.
L'Augusta: The ship was captured by the Royal Navy's HMS Experiment while on a voyage from Guadeloupe to France. She was sent in to Bermuda.
: The corvette was captured by the Royal Navy's . She was sent in to Portsmouth, Hampshire.
La Vengeance : The privateer was captured on 2 March in the Bay of Biscay by the Royal Navy's . She was taken in to Falmouth, Cornwall, Great Britain.
Le Guadeloupean: The privateer was captured by the United States Navy's . She was taken into St. Kitts.
Leith: The ship was captured by a privateer in the West Indies.
Le Scipio: The ship was captured by the Royal Navy's . She was taken in to Portsmouth.
Lewes: The ship was captured by the French while on a voyage from Newfoundland to Figueira, Portugal.
L'Heureux Courier: The privateer, a brig, was captured on 18 April off Ouessant, Finistère by the Royal Navy's . She was brought in to Plymouth, Devon, Great Britain.
Liberty: The ship was captured off Oporto.
Lion: The ship was captured by the French galiot LAbeille.
Lively: The ship was captured by a Spanish privateer while on a voyage from Liverpool, Lancashire to Oporto, Portugal. She was taken in to a Galician port.
: The French privateer Le Brave captured Lord Duncan while she was on a voyage from Antigua to Glasgow, Renfrewshire. The Royal Navy's  later recaptured Lord Duncan and took her in to Falmouth, Cornwall.
Lord Petre: The ship was captured by a Spanish privateer while on a voyage from Mogadore to London. She was taken in to a Spanish port.
Louis: The ship was captured by a French privateer in the Bay of Bengal. She was on a voyage from the East Indies to America.
Louisa: The ship was captured by the Spanish while on a voyage from Lisbon, Portugal to Barcelona, Spain. She was taken in to Tripoli, Ottoman Tripolitania. Eighteen other Swedish vessels were taken in the same action.
L'Union: The privateer was captured by the Guernsey privateer Lord Nelson. She was taken in to Guernsey.
Magicienne: The schooner was captured by the Royal Navy's .
Marcus: The ship was captured by the Spanish while on a voyage from Lisbon to Oporto. She was taken in to Vigo, Spain.
Margaret and Ann: The ship was captured by the French privateer Le Grand Decide while on a voyage from New Providence, New Jersey, United States to London. She was taken in to L'Orient, Ille-et-Vilaine, France.
Maria: The ship was captured by the French while on a voyage from Lisbon, Portugal to Barcelona, Spain. She was taken in to Algeciras, Spain.
Maria: The ship was captured by the French while on a voyage from London to Martinico, West Indies. She was taken in to Guadeloupe.
Maria ( Kingdom of Sicily): The ship was captured by the British while on a voyage from Naples to Hamburgh. She was taken in to Port Mahon, Spain.
Mars: The privateer was captured on 28 March in the Bay of Biscay by the Royal Navy's . She was sent in to Plymouth, Devon, Great Britain.
Martha and Mary: The ship was captured by the French privateer LAuguste.
Martin: The ship was captured by a French privateer while on a voyage from Virginia to Spain. She was taken in to Saint Sebastian's.
Mary : The ship was captured by the French while on a voyage from Jersey, Channel Islands] to Madeira, Portugal. She was sent in to Brest.
Mary: The ship was captured by the French while bound for Baltimore, Maryland, United States. She was taken in to Curaçao.
Mary: The ship was captured off Gibraltar.
Mary ( Guernsey): The ship was captured by the French privateer Aurora while on a voyage from Guernsey to Trinidad. She was later recaptured by the Guernsey privateer Rusce and was taken in to Plymouth, Devon, Great Britain.
Mary: The ship was captured on 7 March while on a voyage from New Providence, Rhode Island, United States to London.
Mary: The ship was captured by a French privateer.
Mary: The ship was captured by the French privateer Bayonis while on a voyage from New York to Jamaica. She was returned after being plundered, taking on board the crew of the American merchantmen Brothers and Sophia, which had alson been captured by Bellona.
Mary and Margaret: The ship was captured by the Spanish between 28 October and 30 November. She was taken in to Bologna, Spain.
Mary Ann: The ship was captured off Oporto, Portugal. She was subsequently recaptured.
Mayflower: The ship was captured in the Atlantic Ocean off Land's End, Cornwall on 9 December by a privateer.
Mediterranean: The ship was captured off Oporto.
Mercury: The ship was captured by the Royal Navy's HMS Experiment. She was taken in to Bermuda.
Merlin: The ship was captured by the French while on a voyage from Africa to the West Indies.
Metis: The ship was captured by the Spanish. She was taken in to Algeciras, Spain.
Minerva : The ship was captured on 25 February by the French privateer La Laure while on a voyage from St. Thomas to London. She was taken in to Brest.
Minerva: The ship was captured by the French privateer Minerva while on a voyage from London to Boston, Massachusetts, United States. She was later recaptured by the Royal Navy's  and taken in to Plymouth, Devon.
Minerva: The ship was captured by the French privateer Bellona while on a voyage from Demerara, British Guiana to London. She was taken in to the Spanish Virgin Iskands.
Minerva: The ship was captured by the French while on a voyage from Danzig, Prussia to Dublin. She was taken in to Morlaix, Finistère, France
Minerva: The ship was captured while on a voyage from Norfolk, Virginia to Martinique. She was later recaptured and was sent in to Dominica.
Molly (flag unknown): The ship was captured in the Atlantic Ocean by the French privateer Cole while on a voyage from Baltimore, Maryland, United States to Hull, Yorkshire, Great Britain. She was sent in to a Spanish port.
Monarch: The ship was captured by the French privateer Bellone while on a voyage from Quebec to London. She was later recaptured and taken in to Plymouth, Devon.
Moses Meyer: The ship was captured while on a voyage from Madeira, Portugal to New York, United States. She was later recaptured and taken in to St. Kitts.
Naard Ligt: The ship was captured by the Royal Navy's . She was sent in to Dartmouth, Devon, Great Britain.
Nancy: The ship was captured by the Spanish while on a voyuage from Jamaica to New Providence, New Jersey She was taken in to Cuba.
Nancy: The ship was captured by the Spanish and taken into Vigo, Spain.
Nancy: The ship was captured by the Spanish while on a voyage from Madeira, Portugal to Lisbon. She was taken in to Palma, Mallorca, Spain.
Neptune: The ship was captured in the Mediterranean Sea on 10 January by a French privateer while on a voyage from Livorno to London. She was taken in to Bastia, Corsica, France.
Neptune: The ship was recaptured by the British revenue cutter HMRC Dolphin. She was taken in to Mount's Bay.
Nettly: The sloop was captured by the Spanish between 28 October and 30 November. She was taken in to Bologna, Spain.
Neutrality: The ship was captured by the French and taken in to Guadeloupe.
Newark: The ship was captured in the North Sea off Buchan Ness, Aberdeenshire by the French privateer Le Marengo while on a voyage from Hamburg to Newcastle-upon-Tyne, Northumberland.
Newhaven: The ship was captured by the French and taken in to Guadeloupe.
New Success: The ship was captured by the French while on a voyage from London to Limerick, Ireland. She was later recaptured by the Guernsey privateer Lively and taken in to Guernsey.
Nile: The ship was captured on 16 November in the North Sea off Cromer by the French privateer Chasseur. She was taken in to Boulogne, France.
Nimrod: The ship was captured on 27 March by a French privateer and was sunk by her.
Neptune: The ship was captured in the North Sea by the Royal Navy's  while on a voyage from Rotterdam to Tenerife, Spain. She was taken in to Great Yarmouth, Norfolk.
Nostra Señora de Camo: The schooner was captured by the French privateer Heureux Courier at St Michael Island  She was later recaptured by the Jersey privateer Tartar and taken in to Jersey.
Nostra Señora de los Dolores: The ship was captured by the Guernsey privateer Resolution while on a voyage from Barcelona to Vera Crus and was taken in to Guernsey.
Nostra Señora de Rosario e Santa Margaretta: The ship was captured by a French privateer while on a voyage from Pernambuco to Lisbon. She was taken in to Vigo, Spain.
Nymph: The ship was captured by the French privateer Vengeance while on a voyage from Mouth Bay to Naples, Kingdom of Sicily She was subsequently recaptured by the Royal Navy's  and taken in to Lisbon, Portugal.
Nymph: The ship was captured off Gibraltar by three privateers while on a voyage from Gallipoli, Ottoman Empire to London.
Oak: The ship was captured in the North Sea by the French while on a voyage from Gainsborough, Lincolnshire to London.
Ocean: The ship was captured by the Royal Navy's  and was taken in to Leith, Lothian
Palladium : The ship was captured by the Spanish while on a voyage from Cork to Jamaica. She was taken in to A Coruña, Spain.
Pallas : The 36-gun fifth rate was captured by the Royal Navy.
Paquet de Fayal: The ship was captured by the Spanish while on a voyage from Lisbon to Madeira. She was taken in to Tenerife, Spain.
Patriot: The ship was captured by the Jersey privateer Revenge while on a voyage from Saint-Domingue, Hispaniola to Spain. She was taken in to Jersey.
Pearson: The ship was captured by a privateer while on a voyage from Jamaica to London. She was recaptured by the Royal Navy's  and sent to the Isles of Scilly.
Peggy: The ship was captured by the Royal Navy's  while on a voyage from Cartagena, Spain to New York. She was sent in to Kingston, Jamaica.
Peggy: The ship was captured by the French privateer LArrange while on a voyage from Oporto, Portugal to Guernsey. She was taken in to L'Orient.
Peggy: The ship was captured by a Spanish privateer while on a voyage from Newfoundland to Oporto. She was later recaptured by the Portuguese and was taken in to Viana, Portugal.
Penelope: The ship was captured off Oporto.
Phœnix: The ship was captured by the French privateer Afrique while on a voyage from the West Indies to livorno. She was taken in to Guadeloupe.
Piersou: The ship was captured on 11 July by the French privateer LEcole while  on a voyage from Jamaica to London. She was later recaptured by the Royal Navy's .
Polly: The ship was captured off Jamaice while bound for London. She was later recaptured and put into St. Lucca, Jamaica.
Pomona ( Hamburg): The ship was captured by the Royal Navy's  while on a voyage from Vera Cruz to Hamburg. She was taken in to Jamaica.
Portland: The ship was captured by a French privateer while on a voyage from New York, United States to Liverpool. She was taken in to Bordeaux.
Portland: The ship was captured by the Spanish while on a voyage from Halifax, Nova Scotia to Jamaica. She was taken in to a Cuban port.
Portland: The ship was captured in the English Channel by two French privateers. She was later recaptured by the Royal Navy's  and taken to The Downs.
President: The ship was captured by the Spanish while of a voyage from Falmouth, Cornwall, Great Britain to Palermo, Kingdom of Sicily. She was taken in to Algeciras, Spain.
Princess Amelia: The ship was captured on 11 May by the French privateer La Decide while on a voyage from the Leeward Islands to Falmouth, Cornwall.
Princess Charlotte: The ship was captured while on a voyage from Falmouth, Cornwall to New York, United States. She was later recaptured by the Royal Navy's  and taken in to Cork, Ireland.
Princess Royal : The ship was captured by the French. She was recaptured on 9 March by the Royal Navy's .
Princess Royal  ( Jersey): The ship was captured on 1 May while on a voyage from Jersey to Labrador, British North America. She was recaptured on 5 May by the British privateer Venus.
Providence ( Jersey): The ship was captured by the French privateer La Decide.
Raccoon: The privateer brig was captured on 27 September off A Coruña, Spain by the Royal Navy's . She was taken in to Plymouth, Devon, Great Britain.
Ranger: The ship was captured by the Dutch while on a voyage from Plymouth, Devon to Aberdeen. She was taken in to Texel, Batavian Republic.
Rapid: The ship was captured off Gibraltar while on a voyage from London to Gibraltar.
Rebecca: The ship was captured off the coast of Africa.
Recovery: The ship was captured by a privateer and abandoned. She was found by the Royal Navy's  and was towed to Falmouth, Cornwall.
Resolution: The ship was captured by a French privateer.
Richmond: The ship was captured while on a voyage from a Batavia to Philadelphia, Pennsylvania, United States. She was later recaptured and sent in to Martinique.
Robert: The ship was captured by the Royal Navy's  while on a voyage from Baltimore, Maryland to Rotterdam, Batavian Republic.
Rose-Bud ( Guernsey): The ship was captured by the French privateer Mars.
Ross: The ship was captured by the Spanish while on a voyage from Port Mahon to Gibraltar. She was taken in to Málaga, Spain.
Salvadora: The ship was captured by the Royal Navy's  while on a voyage from Cadiz to Vera Cruz. She was taken in to Gibraltar.
Santa da Grocez: The ship was captured by the Royal Navy's  while on a voyage from Vera Cruz to Cadiz. She was sent in to Lisbon.
Santa Isable: The brig was captured by the British privateer Earl St. Vincent. She was taken in to Falmouth, Cornwall, Great Britain.
Sarah: The ship was captured by the French while on a voyage from Grenada to Virginia, United States. She was taken in to Curacoa.
Sarah: The ship was captured by the French. She was later recaptured and taken in to Newhaven, East Sussex.
: The ship was captured on 21 January by the French Navy's  while on a voyage from Cork, Ireland to New Providence, The Bahamas. On 5 February the Antiguan privateer Peggy recaptured her.
Seaflower: The ship was captured by the French and was taken in to Guadeloupe.
Sea Nymph: The ship was captured by a French privateer while on a voyage from Lisbon to Oporto, Portugal. She was taken in to a Portuguese port.
S. Fr. de Asis: The privateer was captured by the Guernsey privateer Mayflower and was taken in to Guernsey.
Shandy Hall: The ship was captured by two French Navy frigates while on a voyage from Newfoundland to Portugal, She was set afire and sunk.
Sirene: The ship was captured by a French privateer and was taken in to Bordeaux, Loire-Atlantique, France.
Six Sisters: The ship was captured by the French privateer Le Brave while on a voyage from the West Indies to Lancaster, Lancashire.
Snake ( Jersey): The privateer was captured by the French privateer Vangeur.
Sophia: The ship was captured by a Spanish privateer while on a voyage from Penzance, Cornwall to Livorno. She was taken in to Vigo, Spain.
Sophia: The ship was captured on 12 August off Bermuda by the French privateer Bellona while on a voyage from St. Thomas, Virgin Islands to Halifax.
Southo: The ship was captured by a French privateer while on a voyage from Smyrna to London. She was taken in to Málaga, Spain.
Sovereign: The ship was captured by the French while on a voyage from Newfoundland to the West Indies. She was taken in to Guadeloupe.
Speculation: The ship was captured by the French while on a voyage from Martinique to Jamaica. She was taken in to Guadeloupe.
Speedy : The ship was captured by a French privateer while on a voyage from St. Michael's Mount, Cornwall to London. She was later retaken by her crew and arrived at Youghal, County Cork, Ireland
Stafford: The ship was captured by the French off Land's End, Cornwall She was recaptured by the British sloop Sushsante and taken in to Dartmouth, Devon.
Stephen: The ship was captured by the French privateer Bellona while on a voyage from British Honduras to London.
St. James Planter: The ship was captured by the French privateer Bellone while on a voyage from Jamaica to London. She was later recaptured by the Guernsey privateers Alarm, Dispatch and Marquis of Townsend and taken in to Guernsey.
Sukey: The ship was captured by the French privateer LImpregnable while on a voyage from Emden, Holy Roman Empire to Guernsey, Channel Islands. She was taken in to Delfzijl, Batavian Republic.
: The frigate was captured by the Royal Navy's . She was taken in to Bombay.
Susannah (flag unknown): The ship was captured and taken in to Jersey, Channel Islands.
Susannah: The ship was captured by the Dutch. She was taken in to Texel, Batavian Republic.
Swan: The ship was captured then abandoned.
Swan: The ship was captured on 16 June by the French privateer Gersonge while on a voyage from Oporto, Portugal to Galloway, Ayrshire.
Swift: The ship was captured by the French privateer Le Bergen while on a voyage from Sierra Leone to London. She was taken in to Tenerife, Canary Islands, Spain.
Sybil: The ship was captured but was recaptured by the Guernsey privateer Ruse. She was taken in to Dartmouth, Devon.
Tanner: The ship was captured by the British while on a voyage from Vera Cruz to New York. She was taken in to Jamaica.
Tartar : The privateer was captured by Venus, of Liverpool. She was taken in to Kinsale, County Cork, Ireland.
Tartar: The ship was captured by the French off Benin and sunk.
Tartar: The ship was captured by two Spanish Navy ships while on a voyage from Madeira, Portugal to Martinico, West Indies.
Tigre: The ship was captured in the North Sea by the French.
Tom : The ship was captured by the French privateer LEole.
 : The ship was captured by the French privateer Bougainville while on a voyage from Liverpool to Livorno. She was later recaptured by the Royal Navy's .
Triton: The ship was captured by the Spanish. She was taken in to Oporto, Portugal.
Two Angels (flag unknown): The ship was captured by the United States Navy's  while on a voyage from Cape Francois to Bordeaux, Loire-Atlantique, France.
Union : The ship was captured while on a voyage from Charleston, South Carolina, United States to a British port.
Union : The ship was captured by the French while on a voyage from Africa to the West Indies. She was taken in to Guadeloupe.
Union: The ship was captured in the North Sea off Coquet Island, Northumberland by a French privateer while on a voyage from King's Lynn to Bo'ness, Lothian.
Valiant: The ship was captured by a French privateer. She was taken in to Málaga, Spain.
Vangeur: The privateer was captured by the Royal Navy's  while on a voyage from Bordeaux to Cape Francois. She was taken in to Plymouth, Devon, Great Britain.
Veloz Bascongada: The ship was captured by the British while on a voyage from Santona to Vera Cruz. She was taken in to Jamaica.

Vengeance: The  was captured on 21 August in the Mona Passage  by the Royal Navy's .
 : The 20-gun corvette was captured on 22 October by the Royal Navy's .
Venus: The ship was captured. She was later recaptured by the Royal Navy's  and sent in to Oporto.
Victory (flag unknown): The ship was captured and taken in to Jersey, Channel Islands.
Vine: The ship was captured by a privateer in the North Sea off Flamborough Head, Yorkshire.
Violet: The ship was captured in the English Channel by a French privateer while on a voyage from Littlehampton, West Sussex to Whitby, Yorkshire. She was taken to Boulogne, Pas-de-Calais, France.
Volunteer: The privateer was captured by the Royal Navy's  and was taken in to Lisbon, Portugal.
Vrouw Taatje: The ship was captured while on a voyage from Rotterdam to Lisbon, Portugal. She was taken in to Jersey, Channel Islands.
Wareham : The ship was captured on 12 March by a French privateer. She was subsequently released.
Warren: The ship was captured by the Royal Navy's . She was taken in to Halifax.
Welsarden: The ship was captured while on a voyage from St. Ubes, Spain to Gothenburg. She was taken in to Jersey, Channel Islands.
Whitby Packet: The ship was captured in the English Channel by a French privateer while on a voyage from Littlehampton to Hull. She was taken in to Boulogne, France.
William: The ship was captured by the French privateer Le Brave while on a voyage from the West Indies to Liverpool.
William: The ship was captured by a privateer in the West Indies.
William: The brig was captured in the North Sea by a Dutch privateer. She was later recaptured and sent in to Great Yarmouth, Norfolk.
William and Betsey: The ship was captured by the French while on a voyage from Newfoundland to London. She was taken in to L'Orient, Morbihan, France.
William and Betsey: The ship was captured on 16 November in the North Sea off Cromer by the French privateer Chasseur. She was taken in to Boulogne.
William and Mary: The brig was captured on 10 December in the English Channel off Start Point, Devon by the French privateer Hero she was recaptured on 12 December by the Royal Navy's .
William and Mary: The ship was captured by the Spanish between 28 October and 30 November. She was taken in to Bologna, Spain.
Williamson: The ship was captured on 19 April by the French privateer Bellona while on a voyage from Jamaica to London. She was taken in to Bordeaux.
Winyau: The ship was captured by the French while on a voyage from New York to Falmouth, Cornwall, Great Britain. She was taken in to Brest.
Young William: The ship was captured while bound from the South Seas to London. She was later recaptured and sent in to Cork, Ireland.
Young William: The ship was captured off Jamaica while bound for London.

Unknown date
: American War of Independence, 1775-83: The privateer was captured by the British.

See also
List of ships captured before 1601
List of ships captured in the 17th century
List of ships captured in the 19th century
List of ships captured in the 20th century
List of ships captured in the 21st century
Bibliography of early American naval history

References

Bibliography
 Url
 Url
 Url
 Url
 Url
 Url
 Url
 Url

Notes

 
Lists of captured ships